BFC Dynamo developed a very successful youth academy during the 1970s. The team had an average age of only 22.7 years before the 1978–79 season. Among the young talented players were Hans-Jürgen Riediger, Lutz Eigendorf, Norbert Trieloff, Michael Noack, Roland Jüngling, Rainer Troppa, Bodo Rudwaleit, Ralf Sträßer and Arthur Ullrich. The veterans in the team were Reinhard Lauck, Frank Terletzki, Wolf-Rüdiger Netz and Bernd Brillat. The young team was coached by 31-year-old coach Jürgen Bogs. 

BFC Dynamo got off to a strong start in the 1978-79 DDR-Oberliga and won the first ten matches. Lutz Eigendorf defected to West Germany during a friendly match in Kaiserslautern on 20 March 1979. His defection was considered a slap in the face to the East German regime. BFC Dynamo finally won its first DDR-Oberliga title after defeating rival SG Dynamo Dresden 3–1 on the 24th matchday in front of 22,000 spectators at the Friedrich-Ludwig-Jahn-Sportpark. The team set a number of records during the league season. 

BFC Dynamo made its debut in the European Cup in the 1979–80 season. The team made it all the way to the quarter-finals of the 1979-80 European Cup, where it faced Nottingham Forest under Brian Clough. BFC Dynamo won the first leg away 1–0. BFC Dynamo thus became the first German team to defeat an English team in England in the European Cup. The success in the league continued, but the competition was fierce. BFC Dynamo won the 1979-80 DDR-Oberliga by defeating first-placed SG Dynamo Dresden on the final matchday and the 1980-81 DDR-Oberliga by defeating second-placed FC Carl Zeiss Jena in the final matchday. BFC Dynamo continued to integrate young players from the youth department into the first team, such as Rainer Ernst in 1979, Bernd Schulz in 1979, Olaf Seier in 1979, Frank Rohde in 1980, Falko Götz in 1980 and Christian Backs in 1981.

BFC Dynamo reached the quarter-finals of the 1981-82 European Cup but was eventually eliminated by Aston Villa. BFC Dynamo now began a period of dominance in the league. The team secured its fourth consecutive league title at the end of the 1981-82 DDR-Oberliga and would go through the entire 1982-83 DDR-Oberliga undefeated. BFC Dynamo was only defeated by FC Karl-Marx-Stadt on the seventh matchday of the 1983-84 DDR-Oberliga. It was the team's first loss in 36 league matches. BFC Dynamo was drawn against Partizan Belgrade in the second round of the 1983–84 European Cup. The players Falko Götz and Dirk Schlegel defected to West Germany during a shopping tour in Belgrade before the return leg. Young talented froward Andreas Thom from the youth department  would make his international debut in the match, as a replacement for Falko Götz. BFC Dynamo lost the match but advanced to the quarter-finals on goal difference. The team was eventually eliminated by AS Roma in the quarter-finals. It was the fourth time in five seasons that BFC Dynamo had been eliminated by an eventual finalist. The team reached the final of the 1983-84 FDGB-Pokal but was defeated by SG Dynamo Dresden.

BFC Dynamo was drawn against Aberdeen F.C. under Alex Ferguson in the first round of the 1984-85 European Cup. The team advanced, after a dramatic penalty shoot-out at the Friedrich-Ludwig-Jahn-Sportpark in the return leg. BFC Dynamo continued to dominate the league. The team scored a whopping 90 goals in the 1984-85 DDR-Oberliga. No other team would ever score more goals during a season in the DDR-Oberliga. BFC Dynamo faced rival SG Dynamo Dresden in the final of the 1984–85 FDGB-Pokal. The team lost the match 2–3. For the second consecutive season, SG Dynamo Dresden had stopped BFC Dynamo from winning the Double. The match between 1. FC Lokomotive Leipzig and BFC Dynamo on the 18th matchday of the 1985-86 DDR-Oberliga become historic due to a controversial penalty for BFC Dynamo in extra time. The match ended 1-1. BFC Dynamo captured its eighth consecutive league title on the final matchday of the 1985-86 DDR-Oberliga. The team finished just two points ahead of second-placed 1. FC Lokomotive Leipzig.

BFC Dynamo had the best material conditions in the league and was the best team by far. But controversial refereeing decisions in favor of BFC Dynamo gave rise to speculation that the team's dominance was also due to help from referees. Complaints of alleged referee bias accumulated as the team came to dominate the DDR-Oberliga. The German Football Association of the GDR (DFV) conducted a secret review of the 1984–85 season. Among other things, the review showed that BFC Dynamo received significantly fewer yellow cards than rivals SG Dynamo Dresden and 1. FC Lokomotive Leipzig. A review was also carried out of the final of the 1984-85 FDGB-Pokal. This review showed that the referees had committed several errors in the final to the disadvantage of SG Dynamo Dresden. However, there is no evidence to show that referees were under direct instructions from the Stasi and no document has ever been found in the archives that gave the Stasi a mandate to bribe referees. Former referee Bernd Heynemann concluded: "The BFC is not ten times champions because the referees only whistled for Dynamo. They were already strong as a bear."

The team was joined by Thomas Doll from relegated F.C. Hansa Rostock for the 1986–87 season. Doll and Andreas Thom would form one of the most effective attacking pairings in East German football in the late 1980s. BFC Dynamo met fierce competition from 1. FC Lokomotive Leipzig in the 1986-87 DDR-Oberliga and the 1987-88 DDR-Oberliga. BFC Dynamo and 1. FC Lokomotive Leipzig was level on points heading into the final matchday of the 1987-88 DDR-Oberliga. Both teams won their final matches, but BFC Dynamo finished with a better goal difference, thus winning its tenth consecutive league title. BFC Dynamo then defeated FC Carl Zeiss Jena 2–0 in front of 40,000 spectators at the Stadion der Weltjugend in the final of the 1987–88 FDGB-Pokal. BFC Dynamo had thus finally won the Double. Andreas Thom became the 1988 East German footballer of the year.

BFC Dynamo was drawn against West German champions SV Werder Bremen in the first round of the 1988-89 European Cup. BFC Dynamo sensationally won the first leg 3–0 at the Friedrich-Ludwig-Jahn-Sportpark. However, the team lost the return leg 5–0 at the Weser-Stadion. The return leg would become known as "The Second Miracle on the Weser". BFC Dynamo finished the first half of the 1988-89 DDR-Oberliga in fourth place. It was the team's worst result after a first half of a league season in 14 years. The team's ten-year dominance in the league was eventually broken by SG Dynamo Dresden, who became the new champion in the 1988-89 DDR-Oberliga. BFC Dynamo again won the FDGB-Pokal by defeating FC Karl-Marx-Stadt 1–0 in the final of the 1988-89 FDGB-Pokal. BFC Dynamo then defeated SG Dynamo Dresden 4–1 in the first edition of the DFV-Supercup. BFC Dynamo eventually became the only winner of the DFV-Supercup in the history of East German football.

East German champions and the loss of Lutz Eigendorf (1978–1979)
BFC Dynamo fielded a young team in the 1978–79 season. The average age of the team was only 22,7 years. The team included several young talented players such as Hans-Jürgen Riediger, Lutz Eigendorf, Norbert Trieloff, Michael Noack, Roland Jüngling, Rainer Troppa, Bodo Rudwaleit, Ralf Sträßer and Artur Ullrich. Reinhard Lauck, Frank Terletzki, Wolf-Rüdiger Netz and Bernd Brillat  were the veterans of the team. Terletzki was the team captain. The team was coached by 31-year-old Jürgen Bogs. BFC Dynamo under Bogs would play an aggressive football that focused on attacking. 

BFC Dynamo defeated HFC Chemie 4–1 at home and BSG Wismut Aue 2–3 away in the first two matchdays of the 1978-79 DDR-Oberliga. The team then won the derby against 1. FC Union Berlin 5–0 in the third matchday in front of 32,000 spectators at the Stadion der Weltjugend on 2 September 1979. Wolf-Rüdiger Netz scored four goals in the match. BFC Dynamo had finished the 1977-78 DDR-Oberliga in third place and was qualified for the 1978-79 UEFA Cup. The team was drawn against the Yugoslav powerhouse Red Star Belgrade in the first round. BFC Dynamo won the first leg 5–2 in front of 26,000 spectators at the Friedrich-Ludwig-Jahn-Sportpark on 13 September 1979–78. Hans-Jürgen Riediger scored the first three goals for BFC Dynamo in the match. The return leg was played in front of 60,000 spectators at the Red Star Stadium on 27 September 1978. The score was 3–1 at the end of the match. Miloš Šestić then scored a goal for Red Star Belgrade in stoppage time. BFC Dynamo eventually lost the match 4-1 and was eliminated on the away goal rule. Coach Bogs would many years later describe the defeat to Red Star Belgrade in the return leg as the most bitter defeat of his entire career.

BFC Dynamo defeated 1. FC Union Berlin with 1–8 and then 7–1 in the round of 16 of the 1978-79 FDGB-Pokal. Riediger scored a hat-trick in both legs. He amassed eight goals against 1. FC Union Berlin in the round. The 1978–79 season marked a change in East German football. BFC Dynamo opened the 1978-79 DDR-Oberliga with ten consecutive wins and thus set a new record for the number of consecutive wins at the start of a league season. The previous record was held by SG Dynamo Dresden, who had won seven consecutive matches at the opening of the 1972-73 DDR-Oberliga. The team met SG Dynamo Dresden away on the 11th matchday. SG Dynamo Dresden stood in second place in the league. The match was played in front of 33,000 spectators at Dynamo-Stadion in Dresden on 2 December 1978. Hartmut Schade scored 1-0 for SG Dynamo Dresden in the 57th minute. The match eventually ended in a 1–1 draw after an equaliser by Hans-Jürgen Riediger in the 68th minute on a pass from Lutz Eigendorf. The match was marked by unrest, with numerous fans of both teams arrested. The inexperienced linesman Günter Supp should allegedly have missed an offside on Riediger in the situation that led up to the equaliser. Snowballs were thrown at the departing BFC Dynamo team bus after the match. BFC Dynamo then defeated BSG Chemie Böhlen 6–0 at home on the 12th matchday on 9 December 1978 and FC Karl-Marx-Stadt 1–2 away on the 13th matchday on 16 December 1978. The team finished the first half of the season as Herbstmeister. BFC Dynamo had won 25 points during the first half of the season and thus also set a new record for the number of points won during the first half of a season in the DDR-Oberliga under the current format. The team had won 12 matches and played one draw in its first 13 matches in the 1978-79 DDR-Oberliga.

BFC Dynamo continued to lead the league during the second half of the season. The team defeated 1. FC Union Berlin 0–4 away in the 16th matchday on 3 March 1979. Frank Terletzki scored three goals in the derby. BFC Dynamo then defeated BSG Sachsenring Zwickau 10–0 at home on the 17th matchday on 17 March 1979.  It was the biggest win in the past 30 years of the DDR-Oberliga. Wolf-Rüdiger Netz scored four goals and Hans-Jürgen Riediger three goals in the match. BFC Dynamo then went to West Germany for a friendly match against 1. FC Kaiserslautern on 20 March 1978. The team stopped in the city of Gießen in Hesse on the way back to East Berlin. During a shopping tour in the city, Lutz Eigendorf broke away from the rest of the team and defected to West Germany. Eigendorf was one of the most promising players in East German football. He was a product of the elite Children and Youth Sports School (KJS) "Werner Seelenbinder" in Hohenschönhausen and had come through the youth academy of BFC Dynamo. He was often called "The Beckenbauer of East Germany" and was considered the figurehead and great hope of East German football.  Eigendorf was popularly nicknamed "Iron Foot" by the supporters of BFC Dynamo and was said to be one of the favorite players of Erich Mielke. His defection was a slap in the face of the East German regime and was allegedly taken personally by Mielke. Owing to his talent and careful upbringing at BFC Dynamo, his defection was considered a personal defeat of Mielke. 
His name would later disappear from all statistics and annals about East German football. All fan merchandise with the name or image of Eigendorf would also be removed from the market. Eigendorf was later to die under mysterious circumstances in Braunschweig in 1983.

BFC Dynamo reached the semi-finals of the 1978-79 FDGB-Pokal. The team was drawn against  SG Dynamo Dresden. BFC Dynamo won the first leg 1–0 at home in front of 23,000 spectators at the Friedrich-Ludwig-Jahn-Sportpark on 10 March 1979. The team then qualified for the final after a 1–1 draw in the return leg at the Dynamo-Stadion in Dresden on 31 March 1979. Peter Kotte had scored 1-0 for SG Dynamo Dresden in the 45th minute, but Roland Jüngling equalized for BFC Dynamo in the 64th minute. Hans-Jürgen Riediger was voted the 1978 BFC Dynamo Footballer of the Year at the 13th edition of the club's traditional annual ball in the Dynamo-Sporthalle on 7 April 1979. BFC Dynamo was then set to play 1. FC Magdeburg in the cup final. The match was played in front of 50,000 spectators at the Stadion der Weltjugend on 28 April 1979. The score was 0–0 at full-time. The team eventually lost the final 1-0 after a goal by Wolfgang Seguin for 1. FC Magdeburg in extra time. BFC Dynamo then met 1. FC Magdeburg was away on the 23rd matchday on 23 May 1979. The team lost the match 1–0. Joachim Streich scored the winning goal for 1. FC Magdeburg. The loss against 1. FC Magdeburg on the 23rd matchday was the first loss of the league season. It would also be the only loss of the league season. BFC Dynamo had gone through 22 league matches undefeated since the start of the 1978-79 DDR-Oberliga and broke another record of SG Dynamo Dresden. BFC Dynamo had set a new record for the number of matches undefeated since the start of a season in the DDR-Oberliga. The previous record had been held by SG Dynamo Dresden, who had been undefeated during its first 17 matches in the 1972-73 DDR-Oberliga.

BFC Dynamo then met SG Dynamo Dresden at home on the 24th matchday on 26 May 1979. BFC Dynamo was now five points ahead of second-placed SG Dynamo Dresden, with three matches left to play.  BFC Dynamo won the match 3–1 in front of 22,000 spectators at the Friedrich-Ludwig-Jahn-Sportpark and finally captured its first title in the DDR-Oberliga. Wolf-Rudiger Netz, Michael Noack and Frank Terletzki scored one goal each in the match. The 17-year-old forward Rainer Ernst from the youth department made his debut for BFC Dynamo in the DDR-Oberliga away against BSG Chemie Böhlen on the 25th matchday on 6 June 1979. The team defeated BSG Chemie Böhlen 3–10. BFC Dynamo then defeated FC Karl-Marx-Stadt 3–1 at home on the last matchday on 9 June 1979. BFC Dynamo had managed an astonishing 21 wins, four draws and only one loss during the league season. The team had scored a total of 75 goals during the season and thus also set a new record for the number of goals scored during a season in the DDR-Oberliga under the current format. The previous record of 73 goals was set by ASK Vorwärts Berlin in the 1960 DDR-Oberliga. Hans-Jürgen Riediger became the second-placed league top goal scorer with 20 goals. Peter Rohde retired from his playing career after the season. He was registered in the squad at the beginning of the season but did not play any matches for the first team during the season.

European Cup and continued success in the league (1979–1982)

Debut in the European Cup (1979–1980)
The team was joined by young forward Bernd Schulz from the youth department  for the 1979–80 season. Schulz scored his first goal for BFC Dynamo in the DDR-Oberliga already on the first matchday at home against FC Karl-Marx-Stadt on 17 August 1979. BFC Dynamo qualified for its first participation in the European Cup, as the winner of the 1978-79 DDR-Oberliga. The team was drawn against the Polish side Ruch Chorzów in the first round of the 1979-80 European Cup. BFC Dynamo won the first leg 4–1 in front of 30,000 spectators at the Friedrich-Ludwig-Jahn-Sportpark on 19 September 1979. Wolf-Rüdiger Netz scored the first-ever goal for BFC Dynamo in the European Cup. The team advanced to the second round of the competition after a 0–0 draw in the return leg on 3 October 1979. The 1979-80 DDR-Oberliga would be a tight race between BFC Dynamo and SG Dynamo Dresden. BFC Dynamo conceded its first loss of the league season on the sixth matchday against FC Carl Zeiss Jena on 6 October 1979. Young midfielder Olaf Seier made his first appearance with the first team of BFC Dynamo away against ASG Vorwärts Kamenz in the second round of the 1979-80 FDGB-Pokal on 20 October 1979. BFC Dynamo eliminated Servette FC in the second round of the 1979-80 European Cup and advanced to the quarter-finals. The team finally met SG Dynamo Dresden on the last matchday before the winter break on 15 December 1979. BFC Dynamo stood in second place in the league, four points behind leading SG Dynamo Dresden. The match was played in front of 35,000 spectators at the Dynamo-Stadion in Dresden. The score was 0–0 at half-time. Ralf Sträßer made it 0–1 to BFC Dynamo in the 68th minute. Harmut Pelka then punished a mistake from the duo Hans-Jürgen Dörner and Andreas Schmidt and scored 0–2 in the 70th minute. BFC Dynamo eventually won the match 1-2 and was now only two points behind SG Dynamo Dresden. Goalkeeper Bodo Rudwaleit was voted the 1979 BFC Footballer of the Year at the 14th edition of the club's traditional annual ball.

BFC Dynamo defeated BSG Stahl Riesa 9–1 at home on the 15th matchday on 1 March 1980. Pelka scored four goals in the match. The team was drawn against the English side Nottingham Forest in the quarter-finals of the 1979-80 European Cup. Nottingham Forest was coached by Brian Clough at this time. The first leg was played at City Ground in Nottingham on 5 March 1980. BFC Dynamo won the match 0–1. Hans-Jürgen Riediger scored the winning goal. The win against Nottingham Forest away made BFC Dynamo the first team from Germany to defeat an English team in England in the European Cup. The team then defeated 1. FC Magdeburg 0–1 away on the 16th matchday on 8 March 1980. Frank Terletzki scored the winning goal on a 30-meter free kick. Reinhard Lauck suffered a knee injury in the match against 1. FC Magdeburg would be out for the rest of the season. The return leg against Nottingham Forest was played in front of 30,000 spectators at Friedrich-Ludwig-Jahn-Sportpark on 19 March 1980. BFC Dynamo lost 1-3 and was eliminated on goal difference. Nottingham Forrest would later go on to win the 1979-80 European Cup. BFC Dynamo met BSG Chemie Leipzig at home on the 17th matchday on 15 March 1980. The team won the match 10–0.

BFC Dynamo played a 0–0 draw away against FC Vorwärts Frankfurt on the 19th matchday on 28 March 1980. The team could now capture first place in the league, as SG Dynamo Dresden had lost 4–2 away against 1. FC Lokomotive Leipzig at the same time. Both teams had the same number of points, but BFC Dynamo had a better goal difference. Young midfielder Frank Rohde from the youth department made his debut for BFC Dynamo in the DDR-Oberliga in the match against FC Vorwärts Frankfurt. Frank Rohde was the youngest brother of Peter Rohde. The team lost the lead in the league after a 2–1 loss away to BSG Sachsenring Zwickau on the 21st matchday on 12 April 1980. BFC Dynamo was still in second place in the league before the last matchday, but the team was only one point behind first-placed SG Dynamo Dresden. BFC Dynamo hosted SG Dynamo Dresden at the Friedrich-Ludwig-Jahn-Sportpark on the last matchday on 10 May 1980. The East German football weekly Die neue Fußballwoche (FuWo) reported on the "international match atmosphere". SG Dynamo Dresden only needed a draw to win the league title. The score was 0-0 for a long time. The 22-year-old libero Norbert Trieloff then finally scored 1–0 on a pass from Hartmut Pelka in the 77th minute. BFC Dynamo eventually won the match 1-0 and thus captured its second league title in a row in front of 30,000 spectators. Pelka became the best goal scorer for BFC Dynamo in the league with 15 goals. Dietmar Labes left for BSG Bergmann-Borsig after the season.

Continued success in the league (1981–1982)
The East Germany national football team won a silver medal at the 1980 Summer Olympics in Moscow. BFC Dynamo was represented by five players in the squad: Bodo Rudwaleit, Artur Ullrich, Norbert Trieloff, Frank Terletzki and Wolf-Rüdiger Netz. 
All five played in the final against Czechoslovakia at the Central Lenin Stadion on 2 August 1980. Joachim Hall became the new assistant coach for the 1980–81 season. BFC Dynamo once again fielded a  young team. With the exception of three players, all players in the 18-man squad were between 20 and 25 years old. Harmut Pelka, unfortunately, had to undergo knee surgery during the summer and would be out for almost the entire season. 18-year-old forward Falko Götz from the youth department made his debut for BFC Dynamo in the DDR-Oberliga away against BSG Sachsenring Zwickau on the second matchday of the 1980-81 DDR-Oberliga on 30 August 1980. However, the team simultaneously lost the other of its two most important strikers. Hans-Jürgen Riediger suffered an ankle injury during the match against BSG Sachsenring Zwickau and would be out for the rest of the autumn. This meant that both Pelka and Riediger were out with injuries. It was the third time in his professional career with BFC Dynamo that Riediger was out with an ankle injury.

BFC Dynamo defeated 1. FC Lokomotive Leipzig 3–0 at home on the third matchday on 6 September 1980. Bernd Schulz scored two goals and Artur Ullrich one goal in the match. The team then lost 2–1 away to FC Vorwärts Berlin on the fourth matchday on 13 September 1980. BFC Dynamo qualified for the 1980–81 European Cup as the winners of the 1979-80 DDR Oberliga. The team eliminated APOEL FC in the first round of the competition. BFC Dynamo then defeated FC Rot-Weiß Erfurt 7–1 on the seventh matchday in front of 14,000 spectators at Friedrich-Ludwig-Jahn-Sportpark on 4 October 1980. BFC Dynamo was drawn against the Czechoslovak side TJ Baník Ostrava in the second round of the 1980–81 European Cup. The first leg was played at the Bazaly in Ostrava on 23 October 1980. The match ended in a 0–0 draw.  The return leg was played in front of 18,000 spectators at the Friedrich-Ludwig-Jahn-Sportpark on 5 November 1980. Lubomír Knapp scored 0–1 for TJ Baník Ostrava on a penalty in the 33rd minute. Rainer Troppa then equalized 1–1 on a penalty in the 58th minute. The match eventually ended in a 1–1 draw and BFC Dynamo was eliminated from the competition on the away goal rule. BFC Dynamo stood in first place in the league after the first half of the season. However, the team only led the league on better goal difference. BFC Dynamo had the same number of points as second-placed 1. FC Magdeburg and third-placed SG Dynamo Dresden. 20-year-old Bernd Schulz was the best goal scorer of BFC Dynamo during the first half of the league season with 10 goals. He was also the second-best goalscorer in the league during the first half of the season and had scored the same number of goals as Joachim Streich of 1. FC Magdeburg.

BFC Dynamo defeated 1. FC Lokomotive Leipzig 0–1 away on the 16th matchday on 7 March 1981. Wolf-Rüdiger Netz scored the winning goal. The team then defeated 1. FC Magdeburg 2–4 away on the 18th matchday on 21  March 1980. BFC Dynamo reached the semi-finals of the 1980–81 FDGB-Pokal. The team was eliminated from the competition after losing 5–4 to FC Vorwärts Frankfurt in a penalty shoot-out at the Stadion der Freundschaft on 25 March 1981. It was the third consecutive loss to FC Vorwärts Frankfurt in the 1980–81 season. The guest block of the Stadion der Freundschaft was damaged by supporters of BFC Dynamo during the match. BFC Dynamo defeated FC Karl-Marx-Stadt 5–0 at home on the 21st matchday on 15 April 1981. Hans-Jürgen Riediger, Frank Terletzki, Bernd Schulz, Wolf-Rüdiger Netz and Ralf Sträßer scored one goal each in the match. The team lost 1–3 away against rival SG Dynamo Dresden on the 24th matchday on 16 May 1981. Riediger scored 1–0 for BFC Dynamo in the 14th minute. Then followed three goals by Udo Schmuck, Ralf Minge and Fred Mecke for SG Dynamo Dresden. The 18-year-old midfielder Christian Backs from the youth department made his debut for BFC Dynamo in the DDR-Oberliga away against BSG Stahl Riesa on the 25th matchday on 26 May 1981. BFC Dynamo met FC Carl Zeiss Jena at home on the last matchday. BFC Dynamo was still in first place in the league, but FC Carl Zeiss Jena was only one point behind. BFC Dynamo had a massive goal difference of 72-30 before the match, compared to 56-27 for FC Carl Zeiss Jena. But FC Carl Zeiss Jena would capture the league title if the team won the match. The league final was played in front of 30,000 spectators at Friedrich-Ludwig-Jahn-Sportpark on 30 May 1981. BFC Dynamo defeated FC Carl Zeiss Jena 2-1 and thus captured its third consecutive league title. Netz and Riediger scored one goal each in the match. Netz became the best goalscorer of the BFC Dynamo in the league and the third-best goal scorer in the league with 17 goals. Reinhard Lauck had not managed to successfully recover from the complicated knee injury he had sustained in the spring of 1980 and had to end his playing career after the season.

BFC Dynamo made a new friendly tour to Africa during the summer of 1981. The team played three friendly matches in Mozambique in front of up to 40,000 spectators. The team won the third match 5-1 against Red Star Sports Club. The team also returned to Tanzania and Zanzibar during the African tour. The team defeated Simba S.C. 6–1 in front of 40,000 spectators in Dar es Salaam on 2 August 1981 and then SC KMM 6-1  in front of 28,000 spectators in Zanzibar on 3 August 1961. SC KMKM was a selection from the Navy, Air Force and Security Service.  Christian Backs became a regular player in the first team during the 1981–82 season. BFC Dynamo qualified for the 1981-82 European Cup as winners of the 1980–81 DDR-Oberliga. The team was drawn against the French side AS Saint-Étienne in the qualifying round. AS Saint-Étienne fielded the captain of the France national football team and future French football legend Michel Platini at the time. The first leg ended 1–1 away at the Stade Geoffroy-Guichard on 25 August 1981. BFC Dynamo then won the return leg 2–0 at home in front of 25,000 spectators at Fredrich-Ludwig-Jahn-Sportpark on 4 September 1981. The two goals were scored by Wolf-Rüdiger Netz and Hans-Jürgen Ridigier. The team then took revenge on FC Vorwärts Frankfurt for the previous season with a 6–0 victory at home on the third matchday of the 1981-82 DDR-Oberliga in front of 19,000 spectators at Friedrich-Ludwig-Jahn-Sportpark on 5 September 1981. BFC Dynamo eliminated FC Zürich on the away goal rule in the first round of the 1981-82 European Cup. The team was then drawn against English side Aston Villa in the round of 16. BFC Dynamo lost 1–2 to Aston Villa in the first leg in front of 28,000 spectators at the Friedrich-Ludwig-Jahn-Sportpark on 21 October 1981. Hans-Jürgen Riedier scored the only goal for BFC Dynamo. The team then met rival SG Dynamo Dresden on the ninth matchday on 30 October 1981. The team defeated SG Dynamo Dresden 2–1 in front of 21,000 spectators at Friedrich-Ludwig-Jahn-Sportpark and moved up to first place in the league. BFC Dynamo defeated Aston Villa 1–0 away in the return leg at Villa Park on 4 November 1981. The winning goal was scored by Frank Terletzki. However, the win away was not enough and the team was eliminated on the away goal rule for a second season in a row. Aston Villa would later go on to win the 1981-82 European Cup. The lead in the league after the win against SG Dynamo Dresden would be short-lived. BFC Dynamo lost 2–1 away to 1. FC Magdeburg on the tenth matchday on 14 November 1981. 1. FC Magdeburg thus became a new leader. However, BFC Dynamo recaptured first place in the league already in the following matchday, after a 3-1 win at home against  third-placed FC Carl Zeiss Jena 3–1 on 28 November 1981. BFC Dynamo would not relinquish the lead for the rest of the season.

BFC Dynamo played a friendly match against Bundesliga team VfB Stuttgart during the winter break. The match was arranged at the Friedrich-Ludwig-Jahn-Sportpark on  15 December 1981. The match ended 0–0 in front of 25,000 spectators. The team met FC Vorwärts Berlin in the semi-finals of the 1981-82 FDGB-Pokal on 27 March 1982. The match was a replay of the semi-final during the previous season. However, this time, BFC Dynamo won 2–0 at home and was thus qualified for the final. Wolf-Rüdiger Netz scored his 100th league goal for BFC Dynamo in the 3–0 win over BSG Sachsenring Zwickau on the 19th matchday on 3 April 1982. BFC Dynamo met SG Dynamo Dresden on the 22nd matchday on 24 April  1982. SG Dynamo Dresden won the match 2–1. The two rivals then met  again in the final of the 1981-82 FDGB-Pokal. BFC Dynamo stood in first place in the league and thus had the chance to prepare for its first Double. The final was played in front of 48,000 spectators at the Stadion der Weltjugend on 1 May 1982. Andreas Trautmann  scored 0-1 for SG Dynamo Dresden in the 51st minute, but Hans-Jürgen Riediger equalized in the 82nd minute. The score was still 1-1 after extra time and the match had to be decided on penalties. SG Dynamo Dresen goalkeeper Bernd Jakubowski saved the third penalty shot from BFC Dynamo by young Christian Backs. Hans-Uwe Pilz took the fifth penalty for SG Dynamo Dresden. The score was now 4–4 in the penalty shoot-out. Bodo Rudwaleit got a hand on the ball and was close to a save, but Pilz scored. SG Dynamo Dresden eventually won the final 5–6. BFC Dynamo then defeated 1. FC Magdeburg 4–0 on the 23rd matchday in front of 18,000 spectators at Friedrich-Ludwig-Jahn-Sportpark on 8 May 1982. The lead in the league was now seven points and the team had thus captured its fourth consecutive league title. Supporters of BFC Dynamo invaded the pitch of the Friedrich-Ludwig-Jahn-Sportpark in celebration of the league title. It was the first pitch invasion by the supporters of BFC Dynamo in the DDR-Oberliga. Wolf-Rüdiger Netz and Rainer Troppa became the best goalscorers of BFC Dynamo in the league with 12 goals each. Hartmut Pelka ended his playing career on medical advice after the season. He had been registered in the squad at the beginning of the season but had not been able to play.

Dominance in the league (1982–1986)

Dominance in the league (1982–1983)
BFC Dynamo opened the 1982-83 DDR-Oberliga with three consecutive wins. The team had scored 11 goals without conceding a single goal in the first three matches of the league season.  However, then followed by three draws against 1. FC Lokomotive Leipzig, SG Dynamo Dresden and FC Rot-Weiß Erfurt. The team slipped down to second place in the league, behind FC Carl Zeiss Jena. BFC Dynamo qualified for the 1982-83 European Cup. The team was drawn against the West German champion Hamburger SV in the first round. The first leg was to be played at Friedrich-Ludwig-Jahn-Sportpark on 15 September 1982. Many fans of BFC Dynamo looked forward to the prestigious meeting. But fearing riots, political demonstrations and spectators expressing sympathy for West German football stars such as Felix Magath, the Stasi imposed restrictions on ticket sales. Only 2,000 tickets would be allowed for carefully selected fans. The remaining seats were instead allocated to Stasi employees, Volkspolizei officers and SED officials. The match ended in a 1-1 draw in front of 22,000 spectators at the Friedrich-Ludwig-Jahn-Sportpark. Hans-Jürgen Riedier scored the only goal for BFC Dynamo in the match. The return leg was then played at the Volksparkstadion on 29 September 1982. BFC Dynamo lost 2–0 to Hamburger SV and was eliminated from the competition. Hamburger SV would later go on to win the 1982-83 European Cup. BFC Dynamo met third-placed 1. FC Mageburg on the seventh matchday on 2 October 1982. The two teams had the same number of points. The score was 3–0 to BFC Dynamo after the first half, with two goals in quick succession by Riediger and one goal on a penalty by Artur Ullrich. 1. FC Magdeburg came back in the second half. But BFC Dynamo eventually won the match 3–2 in front of 18,500 spectators at the Friedrich-Ludwig-Jahn-Sportpark.  The team could then capture the first place in the league with a 1–3 win over HFC Chemie on the following matchday, as FC Carl Zeiss Jena lost 1–0 away against 1. FC Lokomotive Leipzig at the same time. BFC Dynamo was three points ahead of the chasing trio 1. FC Lokomotive Leipzig, FC Carl Zeiss Jena and 1. FC Magdeburg after the tenth matchday. BFC Dynamo met FC Carl Zeiss Jena in the quarter-finals of the 1982-83 FDGB-Pokal. The team lost the quarter-final 4–2 in front of 10,000 spectators at Ernst-Abbe-Sportfeld on 13 November 1982. BFC Dynamo finished the first half of the league season in first place. Hans-Jürgen Riediger was the best goalscorer in the league during the first half of the season. He had scored 16 goals in 13 matches.

Frank Terletzki played his 300th league match for BFC Dynamo on the 15th matchday at home against F.C. Hansa Rostock on 26 February 1983. BFC Dynamo won the match 1-0 after one goal by Wolf-Rüdiger Netz. However, the match was not the only cause for celebration. Striker Hans-Jürgen Riediger suffered a new injury at the same time. Riediger badly injured his knee in the match against F.C. Hansa Rostock and would be out for the rest of the season. A new friendly match against VfB Stuttgart was arranged in the spring on the initiative of BFC Dynamo President Manfred Kirste. The match was played in West Germany this time. The match ended 4-3 VfB Stuttgart in front of 8,000 spectators at the Neckarstadion on 8 March 1983. BFC Dynamo met second-placed 1. FC Lokomotive Leipzig at home on the 17th matchday on 12 March 1983. Uwe Zötzsche scored 0–1 to 1. FC Lokomotive Leipzig on a penalty in the 36th minute. Rainer Troppa equalized 1–1 in the 56th minute and Frank Rohde made it 2–1 to BFC Dynamo less than five minutes later. BFC Dynamo eventually won the match 2–1 in front of 14,000 spectators at the Friedrich-Ludwig-Jahn-Sportpark. The team then defeated SG Dynamo Dresden 1–2 away on the following matchday in front of 38,000 spectators at the Dynamo-Stadion in Dresden on 19 March 1983. The match set a new attendance record in Dresden. BFC Dynamo then defeated FC Rot-Weiß Erfurt 1–0 at home on the 19th matchday on 2 April 1983. Rainer Ernst scored the winning goal in the match. The team then met 1. FC Magdeburg was away on the 20th matchday on 9 April 1983. The team won the match 1–2 in front of 28,000 spectators at the Enrst-Grube-Stadion. BFC Dynamo secured the league title after defeating BSG Wismut Aue 1–3 away on the 22nd matchday on 30 April 1983. The team was now 10 points ahead of second-placed FC Carl Zeiss Jena with four matches left to play. BFC Dynamo then defeated BSG Chemie Böhlen 2–9 away on the following matchday on 7 May 1983. Rainer Ernst, Falko Götz and Ralf Sträßer scored two goals each, while Christian Backs and Michael Noack scored one goal each. The team finally met second-placed FC Carl Zeiss Jena at home on the last matchday on 28 May 1983. BFC Dynamo won the match 2–0. Rainer Ernst and Christian Backs scored one goal each. BFC Dynamo finished 1982-83 DDR-Oberliga undefeated. Hans-Jürgen Riedier was the best goalscorer of BFC Dynamo in the league and the third-best goalscorer of the 1982-83 DDR-Oberliga with 16 goals, despite only being able to play 15 matches before his knee injury. By comparison, the best goalscorer in the league, Joachim Streich of 1. FC Magdeburg, had scored 19 goals in 25 matches. Roland Jüngling retired and Olaf Seier left for 1. FC Union Berlin after the season.

Bodo Rudwaleit was the new team captain for the 1983–84 season. Hans-Jürgen Riediger had still not recovered from the knee injury he had suffered on the 15th matchday of the previous season and would not be able to play. BFC Dynamo only managed a 0–0 draw against BSG Wismut Aue on the opening matchday of the 1983-85 DDR-Oberliga on 13 August 1983. It was the first time since the 1977-78 DDR-Oberliga that BFC Dynamo did not win the opening match of the league season. However, the team would remain undefeated in the league. BFC Dynamo qualified for the 1983-84 European Cup as the winner of the 1982-83 DDR-Oberliga. The team easily eliminated the Luxembourg side Jeunesse Esch in the first round with a win in both legs. BFC Dynamo eventually lost 2–1 away to FC Karl-Marx-Stadt on the seventh matchday on 1 October 1983. It was the first loss in the league since the loss against SG Dynamo Dresden on the 22nd matchday in 1981-82 DDR-Oberliga on 24 April 1982. BFC Dynamo had been undefeated for 36 matchdays in the league, which set a new record. BFC Dynamo was drawn against FK Partizan Belgrade in the second round of the 1982-83 European Cup. The first leg was to be played at the Friedrich-Ludwig-Jahn-Sportpark on 19 October 1983. BFC Dynamo won the match 2–0 in front of 19,500 spectators. Falko Götz and Rainer Ernst scored one goal each.  The team met FC Carl Zeiss Jena at home on the eighth matchday on 22 October 1983. BFC Dynamo won the match 5–0. The 18-year-old talented forward Andreas Thom from the youth department made his debut in the DDR-Oberliga in the match against FC Carl Zeiss Jena, as a substitute for Bernd Schulz. The team was then set to play the return leg away against FK Partizan Belgrade on 2 November 1983. The trip to Belgrade would prove dramatic for the team.

Defection and the debut of Andreas Thom (1983)
The players in BFC Dynamo received political training and were kept under strict discipline, demanding both political reliability, obedience and a moral lifestyle. No contact with the West was allowed. The players were also under the supervision of the Stasi. They would have their telephones tapped, their rooms at training camps tapped and be accompanied by Stasi employees on international trips.   The Ministry of the Interior and the Stasi both had employees integrated into the club. It is also likely that individual players in the club had been recruited as so-called Unofficial collaborators (IM), with the task of collecting information about other players.  BFC Dynamo flew to Belgrade with Erich Mielke's service aeroplane on 1 November 1983 for the return leg against  FK Partizan Belgrade. Coach Jürgen Bogs allowed the players to go on a shopping tour in Belgrade the morning before the match.  During their tour in the city, players Falko Götz and Dirk Schlegel defected to West Germany. The duo had jumped into a taxi and fled to the West German embassy. The ambassador decided to take them to the West German Consulate general in Zagreb. With the help of the West German Consulate general in Zagreb, they obtained fake passports and managed to reach Munich. The East German state news agency ADN reported that Götz and Schlegel had been "woed by West German managers with large sums of money" and "betrayed their team". Götz and Schlegel were labeled as "sports traitors". But their defection had no serious consequences for the team. According to Christian Backs, the team only received more political training, but there were no reprisals. However, the loss of two regular players ahead of the match against FK Partizan Belgrade was a challenge. Coach Bogs then decided to give Andreas Thom the chance to make his international debut as a replacement for Falko Götz. Thom had made his first appearance with the first team of BFC Dynamo only five days earlier and had only played five minutes in the DDR-Oberliga. Thom would make a terrific international debut.  BFC Dynamo lost the match 1-0 but advanced to the quarter-finals on goal difference. Thom would henceforth be a regular player in the team.

New titles, goal record and European cup drama (1983–1986)
The competition at the top of the league table would be fierce. BFC Dynamo was in first place in the league after the eighth matchday  But the team lost 4–1 away to competitor 1. FC Magdeburg on the ninth matchday on 5 November 1983. BFC Dynamo thereby slipped down to fourth place in the league. The team then met local rival 1. FC Union Berlin in the following matchday. BFC Dynamo won the derby 4–0 in front of 22,000 spectators at the Stadion der Weltjugend on 19 November 1983. 18-year-old defender Thomas Grether from the youth department made his debut for BFC Dynamo in the DDR-Oberliga in the derby, as a substitute for Wolf-Rüdiger Netz in the 67th minute. The team then met defeated rival SG Dynamo Dresden by 1–2 away in front of 38,000 spectators at Dynamo-Stadion in Dresden on the 11th matchday on 26 November 1983. Grether scored the winning 1–2 goal for BFC Dynamo in the 89th minute. BFC Dynamo was now in second place in the league, with the same number of points as first-placed 1. FC Magdeburg. BFC Dynamo met third-placed 1. FC Lokomotive Leipzig was away on the last matchday before the winter break. The team won the match 0–4. Young forward Andreas Thom scored his first goal for BFC Dynamo in the match.  The team could now climb to first place in the league, as 1. FC Magdeburg had only managed a 1–1 draw away against BSG Chemie Lezipig. BFC Dynamo finished the first half of the season as Herbstmeister. However, the team was only one point ahead of second-placed 1. FC Magdeburg and third-placed SG Dynamo Dresden.

19-year-old midfielder Eike Küttner from the youth department made his debut for BFC Dynamo in the DDR-Oberliga away against BSG Wismut Aue on the 14th matchday on 18 February 1984. The match ended in a 1–1 draw. It was the first time in seven years that BSG Wismut Aue had won a point against BFC Dynamo at home. BFC Dynamo defeated F.C. Hansa Rostock 3–1 at home on the 15th matchday on 26 February 1984. Defender Michael Noack suffered an injury in the match and would be out for the rest of the season. Young defender Mario Maek from the youth department made his debut for BFC Dynamo in the DDR-Oberliga away against BSG Stahl Riesa on the 17th matchday on 10 March 1984, as a substitute for Andreas Rath. BFC Dynamo was drawn against Italian champions AS Roma in the quarter-finals of the 1983-84 European Cup. The first leg was played in front of 62,000 spectators at the Stadio Olimpico in Rome on 7 March 1984. The score was 0-0 after the first half. AS Roma then scored three goals in the second half. BFC Dynamo eventually lost the match 3–0. The return leg was played in front of 25,000 spectators at the Friedrich-Ludwig-Jahn-Sportpark on 21 March 1984. Emidio Oddi scored 0-1 for AS Roma in the 55th minute, but Andreas Thom equalized in the 76th minute with a header on a corner by Frank Terletzki. Rainer Ernst then made it 2-1 for BFC Dynamo in the 87th minute. BFC Dynamo eventually defeated AS Roma 2–1 but was eliminated from the competition on goal difference. AS Roma would go all the way to the final of the 1983-84 European Cup where the team eventually lost in a penalty shoot-out against Liverpool F.C.. It was the fourth time in five seasons that BFC Dynamo had been eliminated from the European Cup by an eventual finalist. The team had three times been eliminated by the team that eventually won the tournament: Nottingham Forest in the 1979–80 season, Aston Villa in the 1981–82 season and Hamburger SV in the 1982–83 season.

BFC Dynamo lost 1–2 at home to FC Vorwärts Frankfurt on the 18th matchday on 17 March 1984. The team was still in first place in the league but now stood on the same points as second-placed SG Dynamo Dresden. SG Dynamo Dresden then took over the lead in the league on the 19th matchday on a better goal difference. But BFC Dynamo could recapture the first place with a 4–2 win over FC-Karl-Marx-Stadt at home on the 20th matchday, as SG Dynamo Dresden had played a 1–1 draw away against HFC Chemie at the same time. BFC Dynamo then met SG Dynamo Dresden at home on the 24th matchday on 5 May 1984. The score was 3–0 for BFC Dynamo after only 14 minutes played, with two goals scored by Rainer Ernst in just 5 minutes. BFC Dynamo eventually won the match 4–2 in front of 28,500 spectators at the Friedrich-Ludwig-Jahn-Sportpark. BFC Dynamo then secured the league title with a 4–5 win away against HFC Chemie on the following matchday on 12 May 1984. Rainer Ernst became the best goal scorer in the 1983-48 DDR-Oberliga with 20 goals. BFC Dynamo reached the final of the FDGB-Pokal for the second season in a row and again had the chance to win the Double. The team once again faced rival SG Dynamo Dresden in the final. The final of the 1983-84 FDGB-Pokal was played in front of 48,000 spectators at Stadion der Weltjugend on 29 May 1984. The score was 0-0 after the first half. Hans-Jürgen Dörner made it 1-0 for SG Dynamo Dresden in the 81st minute. Reinhard Häfner extended the lead to 2–0 on penalty just a minute later. Rainer Troppa scored 2–1 in the 85th minute, but BFC Dynamo could not equalize. BFC Dynamo eventually lost the final 2–1. The team had thus lost its fourth final in a row in the FDGB-Pokal and had once again failed to win the Double. Hans-Jürgen Riediger and Michael Noack ended their careers due to prolonged injuries after the season. Wolf-Rüdiger Netz retired and Ralf Sträßer left for 1. FC Union Berlin. Riediger, Noack and Netz had all played around 200 matches each for BFC Dynamo in the DDR-Oberliga. Riediger and Netz had also scored more than 100 goals each for BFC Dynamo in the DDR-Oberliga.

BFC Dynamo recruited striker Frank Pastor from HFC Chemie and defender Waldemar Ksienzyk from 1. FC Union Berlin for the 1984–85 season. Both HFC Chemie and 1. FC Union Berlin had been relegated to the second tier DDR-Liga after the 1983-84 DDR-Oberliga. The team was also joined by goalkeeper Marco Kostmann from the youth department. Kostmann became a new reserve goalkeeper behind Bodo Rudwaleit. The young defenders Thomas Grether and Mario Maek would also make a number of appearances with the first during the season. The team had an average age of only 22,8 years. BFC Dynamo got off to a strong start to the 1984-85 DDR-Oberliga. The team had four wins and 11–0 in goal difference after the fourth matchday. BFC Dynamo then defeated 1. FC Magdeburg 3–1 on the fifth matchday in front of 15,000 spectators at the Friedrich-Ludwig-Jahn-Sportpark on 15 September 1984. The team was awarded two penalties in the match by referee Siegfrid Kirschen, which were converted by Rainer Ernst. BFC Dynamo was head-to-head with SG Dynamo Dresden in the league. Both teams had a full ten points after the first five matchdays. But SG Dynamo Dresden led the league on better goal difference. BFC Dynamo qualified for the 1984-85 European Cup as winners of the 1983-84 DDR-Oberliga. The team was drawn against Scottish champions Aberdeen F.C. in the first round. Aberdeen F.C. was managed by Alex Ferguson at the time. BFC Dynamo lost the first leg 2–1 away at the Pittodrie Stadium in Aberdeen on 19 September 1984. Bernd Schulz scored the only goal for BFC Dynamo in the match. The team then met FC Rot-Weiß Erfurt away at the Georgij-Dimitroff-Stadion on the sixth matchday on 28 September 1984. BFC Dynamo won a hard-fought 4–5 win against FC Rot-Weiß Erfurt. Rainer Ernst scored the winning goal for BFC Dynamo on a penalty in the 83rd minute, after a foul by Olaf Berschuk on Frank Pastor. BFC Dynamo captured first place in the league, as SG Dynamo Dreden only got 1–1 against BSG Stahl Brandenburg on the sixth matchday. The return leg against Aberdeen F.C. was played at Friedrich-Ludwig-Jahn-Sportpark on 3 October 1984. The score was 2–1 to BFC Dynamo after extra time and the round was decided on penalties. Aberdeen F.C. took the lead in the third penalty round after Bernd Scultz had missed a shot. Willie Miller then had the opportunity to decide the penalty shoot-out for Aberdeen F.C. in the fifth round, but Bodo Rudwaleit saved the shot. Frank Terletzki was then able to equalize to 4-4. Eric Black took the sixth penalty for Aberdeen F.C., but also this shot was saved by Rudwaleit. Libero Norbert Trieloff then scored the decisive goal for BFC Dynamo. BFC Dynamo eventually won the penalty shoot-out 5–4 in front of 25,000 spectators at Friedrich-Ludwig-Jahn-Sportpark and advanced to the second round of the tournament.

BFC Dynamo conceded its first defeat of the league season on the eighth matchday 3–2 away against 1. FC Lokomotive Leipzig on 13 October 1984. SG Dynamo Dresden could thus take the lead in the league. BFC Dynamo was drawn against FK Austria Wien in the second round of the 1984-85 European Cup. The first leg ended 3–3 in front of 21,000 spectators at Friedrich-Ludwig-Jahn-Sportpark on 24 October 1984. BFC Dynamo then followed up the loss against 1. FC Lokomotive Leipzig in the league with a massive 6–1 win at home over FC Karl-Marx-Stadt on the ninth matchday on  27 October 1984. The return match against FK Austria Wien was then played at the Gerhard-Hanappi-Stadion on 7 November 1984. The score was 1-1 after the first half. Tibor Nyilasi then made it 2–1 to FK Austria Wien in the 65h minute. BFC Dynamo eventually lost 2-1 and was eliminated from the competition. The team then met rival SG Dynamo Dresden away on the tenth matchday on 10 November  1984. The score was 1–1 in the second half. Rainer Ernst made it 1-2 for BFC Dynamo in the 59th minute, but Torsten Gütschow put the final score 2–2 in the 80th minute. BFC Dynamo was still in second place in the league after the 11th matchday. But the team defeated BSG Motor Sulh 6–0 at home on the 12th matchday on 1 December 1984. SG Dynamo played 1–1 at home against FC Vorwärts Frankfurt at the same time. The BFC Dynamo could thus capture first place in the league. The team only managed a 3–3 draw away against FC Vorwärts Frankfurt on the 13th matchday on 15 December 1984. BFC Dynamo led the match 0–2 in the second half. But André Jarmuszkiewicz first managed to reduce to 1-2 and then equalize 2–2 on a penalty. FC Vorwärts Frankfurt then took the lead 3–2, but Frank Rohde eventually saved a point for BFC Dynamo with a 3-3 goal in the 82nd minute. However, SG Dynamo Dresden lost 4–0 away against FC Carl Zeiss Jena at the same time. BFC Dynamo was thus able to finish the first half of the season as Herbstmeister, two points ahead of SG Dynamo Dresden.

BFC Dynamo defeated FC Carl Zeiss Jena 1–0 on the 14th matchday on 16 February 1985. The team could thus extend the lead in the league, as SG Dynamo Dresden only managed a 0–0 draw away against BSG Chemie Leipzig. BFC Dynamo then defeated BSG Chemie Leipzig 5–1 on the following matchday on 23 February 1985. The team defeated BSG Stahl Riesa 9–0 at home on the 17th matchday on 9 March 1985. Rainer Ernst, Andras Thom, Frank Pastor and Christian Backs scored two goals each. BFC Dynamo reached the semi-finals of the 1984-85 FDGB-Pokal. The team was drawn against 1. FC Magdeburg. The team lost the first leg 3–4 at home in front of 13,000 spectators at Friedrich-Ludwig-Jahn-Sportpark on 23 March 1985. BFC Dynamo defeated BSG Stahl Brandeburg 0–1 away in front of 11,000 spectators at Stahl Stadion on the 20th matchday on 13 April 1985. The winning goal was scored by young striker Jan Voß, who was brought onto the pitch as a substitute for Rainer Ernst in the 64th minute. The team could thus extend the lead in the league to five points, as SG Dynamo lost 2–3 at home to 1. FC Lokomotive Leipzig at the same time. BFC Dynamo then defeated 1. FC Lokomotive Leipzig 3–2 in the following matchday in front of 13,000 spectators at Friedrich-Ludwig-Jahn-Sportpark on 20 April 1985. The return leg against 1. FC Magdeburg in the semi-finals of the 1984-85 FDGB-Pokal was played at the Ernst-Grube-Stadion on 1 May 1985. BFC Dynamo won the match 2–0 in front of 28,000 spectators and thus qualified for the final. Andreas Thom and Frank Rohde scored one goal each in the match. BFC Dynamo then finally met rival SG Dynamo Dresden at home on the 23rd matchday on 4 May 1985. SG Dynamo Dresden won the match 2-1 and closed the gap in the league. Ralf Minge scored both goals for SG Dynamo Dresden. However, BFC Dynamo still led the league by four points. BFC Dynamo then defeated F.C. Hansa Rostock 1–5 away on the 24th matchday on 11 May 1985. The team was then able to  secure the league title after an 0–8 win away against BSG Motor Suhl on the 25th matchday on 22 May 1985. BFC Dynamo finished 1984–85 in the first place, six points ahead of SG Dynamo Dresden. The team scored a total of 90 goals in the league. No team would ever score more goals in a season of the DDR-Oberliga. Rainer Ernst became the best goal scorer in the league with 24 goals and Frank Pastor became the second-best goal scorer in the league with 22 goals. BFC Dynamo was then set to play SG Dynamo Dresden in the final of the 1984-85 FDGB-Pokal. The final was played in front of 48,000 spectators at the Stadion der Weltjugend on 8 June 1985. The score was 0–1 to SG Dynamo Dresden after the first half. Andreas Thom equalized 1–1 in the 51st minute. But then followed two goals by Jörg Stübner and Ralf Minge. Rainer Ernst managed to score 2–3 in the 88th minute, but the match eventually ended 2–3 for SG Dynamo Dresden. It was the fourth loss to SG Dynamo Dresden in the final of the FDGB-Pokal and the third time that SG Dynamo Dresden had stopped BFC Dynamo from winning the Double. Reserve goalkeeper Reinhard Schwerdtner was transferred to SG Dynamo Schwerin after the season.
 
Young midfielder Eike Küttner would make recurring appearances with the first team during the season. BFC Dynamo started the 1985-86 DDR-Oberliga with the derby against 1. FC Union Berlin. The team defeated 1. FC Union Berlin 2–1 in front of 30,000 spectators at the Stadion der Weltjugend on 17 August 1985. Frank Pastor and Rainer Ernst scored one goal each in the match. BFC Dynamo then defeated 1. FC Magdeburg 3–1 on the third matchday on 30 August 1985. The team was in second place in the league after the third matchday, one point behind SG Dynamo Dresden. BFC Dynamo qualified for the 1985-86 European Cup, as winners of the 1984-85 DDR Oberliga. The team was drawn against FK Austria Wien in the first round. It was a replay of the second round of the last season. The first leg was played in front of 21,000 spectators at Friedrich-Ludwig-Jahn-Sportpark on 18 September 1985. BFC Dynamo had two goal chances already in the first minutes of the match, with two close shots by Rainer Ernst and Christian Backs. However, FK Austria Wien got 0–1 in the fourth minute, after an unfortunate header by Artur Ullrich which went into his own goal. Toni Polster then made it 0-2 for FK Austria Wien in the 12th minute. Rainer Ernst later missed a chance to score a goal on a penalty. BFC Dynamo eventually lost the match 0–2. BFC Dynamo defeated 1. FC Lokomotive Leipzig 1–0 on the fifth matchday in front of 10,000 spectators at the Friedrich-Ludwig-Jahn-Sportpark on 21 September 1985. The winning goal was scored by Bernd Schulz. The team was then set to play the return leg against FK Austria Wien at the Gerhard-Hanappi-Stadion on 2 October 1985. The score was 0-0 after the first half. Tibor Nyilasi and Gerhard Steinkogler then scored two goals for FK Austria Wien. BFC Dynamo eventually lost the match 2-1 and was eliminated from the competition.

The team met rival SG Dynamo Dresden away on the sixth matchday on 5 October 1985. BFC Dynamo lost the match 4–1. It was the team's first loss of the league season. BFC Dynamo was still in second place in the league but was now three points behind leading SG Dynamo Dresden. The team defeated FC Karl-Marx-Stadt at home on the seventh matchday on 9 October 1985. BFC Dynamo was thus able to close the gap to first-placed SG Dynamo Dresden, as SG Dynamo Dresden had lost 2–1 away against BSG Stahl Brandenburg at the same time.  BFC Dynamo and SG Dynamo Dresden stood on the same number of points after the eighth matchday. BFC Dynamo then defeated FC Rot-Weiß Erfurt 2–3 away on the ninth matchday in front of 26,000 spectators at the Georgij-Dimitroff-Stadion on 26 October 1985. Andreas Thom scored two goals in the match. The team was thus able to capture the first place in the league, as SG Dynamo Dresden had only managed 1–1 away against BSG Sachsenring Zwickau. BFC Dynamo then defeated BSG Sachsenring Zwickau 4–1 at home on the tenth matchday on 9 November 1985. 19-year-old defensive midfielder Jörg Fügner from the youth department made his debut for BFC Dynamo in the DDR-Oberliga as a substitute for Frank Terletzki in the match against BSG Sachsenring Zwickau. The team then lost 2–1 away against FC Vorwärts Frankfurt on the 12th matchday on 23 November 1985. However, BFC Dynamo was able to keep the lead in the league, as SG Dynamo Dresden had also lost its match. BFC Dynamo finished the first half of the season in first place, two points ahead of second-placed SG Dynamo Dresden. Forward Jan Voß left for BSG Stahl Brandenburg during the winter break.

The team was joined by defender Burkhard Reich and striker Peter Kaehlitz from SG Dynamo Fürstenwalde and midfielder Michael Schulz from BSG Stahl Brandenburg for the second half of the 1985–86 season. Young defender Heiko Brestrich from the youth department would also make a number of appearances with the first team during the second half of the season. Brestrich would regularly be included in the starting lineup. BFC Dynamo had won nine of its 13 matches in the first half of the season. The team now opened the second half of the season with three draws. However, rival SG Dynamo Dresden lost even more points during its first matches of the second half of the season. BFC Dynamo was still in first place in the league after the 17th matchday. The team was now five points ahead of second-placed SG Dynamo Dresden with one match more played, eight points ahead of third-placed FC Carl Zeiss Jena with three matches more played and eight points ahead of fourth-placed 1. FC Lokomotive Leipzig with two  matches more played. BFC Dynamo played 1. FC Lokomotive Leipzig was away on the 18th matchday on 22 March 1986. 1. FC Lokomotive Leipzig led the match 1-0 after 90 minutes played. Referee Bernd Stumpf then awarded BFC Dynamo a penalty in the 94th minute, after a foul by Hans Richter on Bernd Schulz. Frank Pastor safely converted the penalty and set the final score to 1-1. The result meant that 1. FC Lokomotive would no longer have a realistic chance of catching up with BFC Dynamo in the league. BFC Dynamo was also able to extend its lead over SG Dynamo Dresden, as SG Dynamo Dresden had lost 3–1 away against FC Karl-Marx-Stadt on the 18th matchday. The penalty was highly controversial and caused a wave of protests in East German football. However, it would many years later be shown that the penalty was correctly awarded. BFC Dynamo then met SG Dynamo Dresden on the 19th matchday on 29 March 1986. The team took revenge for the loss during the autumn and defeated SG Dynamo Dresden 5–2 in front of 18,000 spectators at the Friedrich-Ludwig-Jahn-Sportpark. Striker Peter Kaehlitz scored two goals for BFC Dynamo in the match.
 

BFC Dynamo reached the semifinals of the 1985-86 FDGB-Pokal. The team was drawn against 1. FC Lokomotive Leipzig. BFC Dynamo won the first leg 4–2 at home on 29 April 1986. Uwe Zötzsche scored both goals for 1. FC Lokomotive Leipzig on penalties. BFC Dynamo then met FC Karl-Marx-Stadt on the 20th matchday on 5 April 1986. The team lost the match 2–1. The loss against FC Karl-Marx-Stadt was the beginning of a series of weak results in the league. The return leg against 1. FC Lokomotive Leipzig was played at Bruno-Plache-Stadion on 6 May 1986. Uwe Zötzsche scored another goal on penalty for 1. FC Lokomotive Leipzig in the return leg. BFC Dynamo lost the match 3-1 and was eliminated on the away goal rule. 1. FC Lokomotive Leipzig had scored a total of three goals on penalties against BFC Dynamo in the semi-finals. BFC Dynamo played a number of draws in the following league matches. The team was only three points ahead of second-placed 1. Fc Lokomotive Leipzig and four points ahead of third-placed FC Carl Zeiss Jena after the 24th matchday.  The team then met FC Carl Zeiss Jena at the Ernst-Abbe-Sportfeld on the 25th matchday on 14 May 1986. BFC Dynamo lost the match 3–1.  The team was now only two points ahead of second-placed FC Carl Zeiss Jena and third-placed 1. FC Lokomotive Leipzig before the final matchday. FC Carl Zeiss Jena also had a better goal difference. BFC Dynamo eventually won the league title after a 4–0 victory over bottom team BSG Stahl Riesa at the Friedrich-Ludwig-Jahn-Sportpark on 24 May 1986. Michael Schulz scored two goals in the match. It was the club's eighth consecutive league title. The team ended up just two points ahead of second-placed 1. FC Lokomotive Leipzig. The former long-term team captain Frank Terletzki retired after the season. Olof Hirsch left for 1. FC Union Berlin and Artur Ullrich for F.C. Hansa Rostock.

Controversy, complaints and sanctions (1985–1986)
BFC Dynamo had the best material conditions in the league and was the best team by far. But there had been controversial refereeing decisions in favor of BFC Dynamo, which gave rise to speculations that the dominance of BFC Dynamo was not solely due to athletic performance, but also due to help from referees.

Allegations of referee bias were nothing new in East German football and were not isolated to matches involving BFC Dynamo. Alleged referee bias as a source of unrest was a thread that ran from the very first matches of the DDR-Oberliga. Alleged referee bias had caused riots already during the first season, when ZSG Horch Zwickau defeated SG Dresden-Friedrichstadt 5–1 on 16 April 1950, in a match which decided the title in the 1949–50 DDR-Oberliga. Another example occurred in the 1960 DDR-Oberliga when ASK Vorwärts Berlin defeated SC Chemie Halle away on 16 October 1960. The player bus of ASK Vorwärts Berlin was attacked and the Volkspolizei had to protect the players. The home ground of Union Berlin was closed for two matchdays as a result of crowd trouble over the performance of referee Günther Habermann in the match between Union Berlin and FC Vorwärts Frankfurt in the 1982-83 DDR-Oberliga on 25 September 1982. The police had been forced to come to the rescue of referee Habermann. German sports historian Hanns Leske claims that referees throughout the history of East German football had a preference for the teams sponsored by the armed organs.

BFC Dynamo was deeply unpopular in Dresden since the relocation of SG Dynamo Dresden in 1954. Its unparalleled run of success would then arouse envy and hatred among supporters of opposing teams around the country. However, the sense that BFC Dynamo benefited from the soft refereeing decision did not arise first after 1978. It had already existed for years, as shown by the riots among supporters of SG Dynamo Schwerin during the match between the two teams at the Sportplatz Paulshöhe in Schwerin in the 1967-68 DDR-Liga on 26 May 1968.   BFC Dynamo was a representative of both the Stasi and the capital. The club was therefore viewed with more suspicion than affection. Lack of success had kept disapproval in check. But complaints increased and feelings became inflamed as the club grew successful. A turning point was the fractious encounter between BFC Dynamo and SG Dynamo Dresden at the Dynamo-Stadion in Dresden on 2 December 1978. The match was marked by crowd trouble, with 35 to 38 fans of both teams arrested. The match ended in a 1–1 draw after an equalizer by BFC Dynamo. Then SED First Secretary in Bezirk Dresden Hans Modrow blamed the unrest on "inept officiating". Inexperienced linesman Günter Supp should allegedly have missed an offside position on Hans-Jürgen Riediger in the situation leading up to the equalizer. Supporters of SG Dynamo Dresden complained: "We are cheated everywhere, even on the sports field".

The privileges of BFC Dynamo and its overbearing success in the 1980s made fans of opposing teams easily aroused as to what they saw as manipulation by bent referees, especially in Saxon cities such as Dresden and Leipzig. Petitions to authorities were written by citizens, fans of other teams and local members of the SED, claiming referee bias and outright match-fixing in favor of BFC Dynamo. Animosity towards the club had been growing since its first league titles. The team was met at away matches with aggression and shouts such as "Bent champions!" or "Stasi-pigs!". Fans of BFC Dynamo would even be taunted by fans of opposing teams with "Jewish pigs!" and "Berlin Jews!". Coach Jürgen Bogs would later claim that the hatred from opposing fans actually made the team even stronger.

Complaints of alleged referee bias accumulated. The number of petitions reached hundreds in 1985 and 1986. The authorities were not insensitive to the problems caused by the successes of BFC Dynamo. High-ranking officials such as Rudolf Hellmann sometimes answered petitions in person.  A petition written to Egon Krenz in 1986 was even answered by Hellman with a personal meeting.  SED Functionary Karl Zimmermann from Leipzig had been appointed new general secretary of the German Football Association of the GDR (DFV) in 1983. He was also vice president of the German Gymnastics and Sports Federation (DTSB) and enjoyed expanded powers compared to his predecessor Werner Lempert. Zimmermann had been chosen to carry out reforms. The scandal surrounding alleged referee bias in East German football had so undermined the credibility of the national competitions by the mid-1980s that Krenz, Hellman and the DFV under Zimmermann would eventually be forced to impose penalties on referees for poor performance and restructure the referee commission.

The DFV under Karl Zimmermann had commissioned a secret review on referee performance and behavior in relation to the matches involving BFC Dynamo, SG Dynamo Dresden and Lokomotive Leipzig in the 1984–85 season. The review came to the conclusion that BFC Dynamo was favored. The report claimed that BFC Dynamo had gained at least 8 points due to clear referee errors during the 26 matches of the league season. The report claimed that there had been a direct preference for BFC Dynamo in ten matches. It also claimed that SG Dynamo Dresden and Lokomotive Leipzig had been disadvantaged in eight matches together. The review showed that 45 yellow cards had been handed out to SG Dynamo Dresden and 36 to Lokomotive Leipzig, compared to 16 yellow cards for BFC Dynamo. There were instances where key players in SG Dynamo Dresden and Lokomotive Leipzig had received yellow cards before matches against BFC Dynamo so they were banned from the next match. The review also found instances where clear offside goals had been recognized for BFC Dynamo and clear penalties and correct goals denied to opposing teams. A particularly drastic example allegedly occurred during the 1–1 draw between BSG Wismut Aue and BFC Dynamo on the 16th matchday on 2 March 1985. Sports historian Hanns Leske claims that BSG Wismut Aue scored a winning goal that was disallowed for being offside. Leske claims that the decision was so obviously wrong that the scene could not be shown at the Sport Aktuell (de) cast on East German television. The report also spoke of journalists being threatened by anonymous secret-police representatives. 

The report from the review of the 1984–85 season named six referees that were suspected of having favored BFC Dynamo, including Adolf Prokop, Klaus-Dieter Stenzel and Reinhard Purz. It also named a number of referees that were suspected of having disadvantaged SG Dynamo Dresden and Lokomotive Leipzig, including Klaus-Dieter Stenzel, Wolfgang Henning and Klaus Scheurell. The report spoke of "targeted influence from other bodies" on referees. One leading referee had allegedly been given a holiday home at the expense of the club. Zimmermann was ultimately worried about the reputation of BFC Dynamo. He warned that the hatred against BFC Dynamo was growing and that the performance of the team was being discredited. The report spoke of "the great damage" that referee bias did to the reputation of BFC Dynamo. Zimmermann called for a suspension of referee Prokop for two international matches and recommended that several referees, including Prokop, Stenzel and Gehard Demme, should no longer be used in matches involving BFC Dynamo, SG Dynamo Dresden and Lokomotive Leipzig. The report eventually ended end up with Egon Krenz, who was a member of the SED Politbüro and the Secretary for Security, Youth and Sport in the SED Central Committee. Several referees would then come to receive sanctions for their performances in the following months.

The performance of the referees in the final of the 1984–85 FDGB-Pokal between BFC Dynamo and SG Dynamo Dresden was also controversial. The DFV and the East German football weekly Die neue Fußballwoche (FuWo) received more than 700 complaints regarding the performance of the referees in the final. The performance of the referees also resulted in arguments at the top levels of the SED and the East German regime. Politburo member Harry Tisch was so upset about the performance of referee Manfred Roßner in the final that he protested to Erich Mielke and complained that such performance undermined the credibility of the competition.  DFV functionaries, as well as Egon Krenz and other SED politicians, became increasingly uneasy about the negative reactions.  The report from the review of the 1984–85 season had already outlined a number of measures to clean up the game. Now, the SED now demanded further action. The DFV conducted a special review of the video recording of the final. The review found that referee Roßner and his two assistants had committed an above-average number of errors during the final. The majority of the errors favored BFC Dynamo. The DFV sanctioned referee Roßner with a ban on matches above the second tier as well as international matches for the coming season. Assistant Klaus Scheurell was in turn de-selected from the first round of the next European cup. Zimmermann now also spoke out against the head of the referee commission Heinz Einbeck, who was a native of Berlin and a sponsoring member of BFC Dynamo. However, nothing emerged that indicated that Roßner had been bought by the Stasi. Roßner had been approached by the incensed DFV Vice President Franz Rydz after the match, who took him to task for his performance with the words "You can't always go by the book, but have to officiate in a way that placates the Dresden public".

Also, other officials were sanctioned by the DFV in the following months. Referee Reinhard Purz and linesman Günter Supp were questioned for their performances during the controversial match between BFC Dynamo and FC Rot-Weiß Erfurt on the ninth matchday of the 1985-86 DDR-Oberliga on 26 October 1985. BFC Dynamo won the match 2–3. The winning goal was scored by Andreas Thom. The journalist Gerhard Weigel wrote in the local newspaper Das Volk that Purz had made "two game-changing mistakes". Purz had allegedly given BFC Dynamo an irregular goal and denied FC Rot-Weiß Erfurt a clear penalty. Also, BFC Dynamo coach Jürgen Bogs said after the match that his team did not need such "nature protection". Purz received a suspension for the rest of 1985 and Supp a suspension for three matchdays for their performances during the match.

 The general disillusionment about BFC Dynamo stood at its peak during the 1985–86 season. The DFV had come under intense pressure to take action against referees that allegedly favored BFC Dynamo, notably from the Department for Sport of the SED Central Committee under Rudolf Hellmann. One of the most controversial situations occurred during the match between Lokomotive Leipzig and BFC Dynamo in the 1985-86 DDR-Oberliga on 22 March 1986. Lokomotive Leipzig led the match 1-0 into extra time when BFC Dynamo was awarded a penalty by referee Bernd Stumpf in the 94th minute. Frank Pastor converted the penalty and equalized it. The match ended in a 1–1 draw. The episode, which was later known as "The shameful penalty of Leipzig", caused a wave of protests. SED Second Secretary in Bezirk Leipzig Helmut Hackenberg warned the Department for Party Organs of the SED Central Committee that corrupt referees were bringing East Germany, the DFV and the clubs of the security organs into disrepute. A report in Junge Welt demanded referees who "do not provide doubtful justice which does harm to our champion team BFC, its reputation acquired by continuous high performance, indeed to each and every player in this team".

SED General Secretary Erich Honecker and Egon Krenz were fed up with the "football question" and the "BFC question". Protests flowed into Krenz's office from outraged citizens and party members at a time when the SED was preparing for its 11th Party Congress. Honecker wanted quiet. The DFV Presidium and its General Secretary Zimmermann seized the opportunity to take action. An example was made of Stumpf. He eventually received a lifetime ban from refereeing. Two SV Dynamo representatives in the referee commission, Einbeck and Gerhard Kunze were also replaced. The sanctions against Stumpf were approved by Honecker and Krenz in the SED Central Committee. However, Mitteldeutscher Rundfunk (MDR) was able to publish a previously unknown video recording from the match in 2000. The video recording had been filmed by BFC Dynamo for training purposes and showed the controversial situation from a different angle. The video recording showed that the decision by Stumpf was correct and that the sanctions against him were unjustified. In the video recording, it was possible to see how Hans Richter pushed Bernd Schulz with both hands in the penalty area.

It was later known that Prokop had been a Stasi officer, employed as an officer in special service (OibE) and that several referees, including Stumpf, had been  Unofficial collaborators (IM) of the Stasi. But there is no evidence to show that referees were under direct instructions from the Stasi and no document has ever been found in the archives that gave the Stasi a mandate to bribe referees. The benefit of controlling important matches in Western Europe, gifts to wives and other forms of patronage, might have put indirect pressure on referees to take preventative action, in so-called preemptive obedience. In order to pursue an international career, a referee would need a travel permit, confirmed by the Stasi. The German Football Association (DFB) has concluded that "it emerged after the political transition that Dynamo, as the favorite club of Stasi chief Erich Mielke, received many benefits and in case of doubt, mild pressure was applied in its favor". Prokop protests against having manipulated matches. He was never banned from refereeing. He points out that top teams are viewed with skepticism and claims to have never received threatening letters from angry fans. Prokop was still invited to nostalgia matches for the East Germany national football team in the 2010s.

The picture that the success of BFC Dynamo relied upon referee bias has been challenged by ex-coach Jürgen Bogs, ex-goalkeeper Bodo Rudwaleit, ex-forward Thom and others associated with the club. Some of them admit that there might have been cases of referee bias. But they insist that it was the thoroughness of their youth work and the quality of their play that earned them their titles. Bogs said in an interview with Frankfurter Rundschau: "You cannot postpone 26 matches in one season in the DDR-Oberliga. At that time we had the best football team". Bogs cite a team with strong footballers and modern training methods as the main reasons for the winning streak. The club performed things such as heart rate and lactate measurements during training, which only came to the Bundesliga many years later. Bogs also worked with video evaluations during his period as coach of BFC Dynamo, which was not yet common in East Germany. Bodo Rudwaleit said in an interview with Die Zeit: "We were a great team. We went out and wanted to show those assholes. It usually worked too. And then mass hysteria: Cheating! BFC referee! Although, with some decisions, I do remember thinking, 'My God! Is that really necessary?' But really, it didn't matter how the referee did, everything was blown out of proportion with us. No one gave me a title, I've worked hard, people should think what they want. What I know, I know all for myself, and that's enough." Jörn Lenz said in an interview with CNN: "Maybe we had a small bonus in the back of referees' minds, in terms of them taking decisions in a more relaxed way in some situations than if they'd been somewhere else, but one can't say it was all manipulated. You can't manipulate 10 league titles. We had the best team in terms of skill, fitness and mentality. We had exceptional players". Also, former referee Bernd Heynemann, who has testified that he was once greeted in person by Mielke in the locker room at the Friedrich-Ludwig-Jahn-Sportpark, said in an interview with the Leipziger Volkszeitung in 2017: "The BFC is not ten times champions because the referees only whistled for Dynamo. They were already strong as a bear".

South African-British author Simon Kuper writes in his book "Football Against the Enemy" that "Dynamo won lots of matches with penalties in the 95th minute". However, Kuper provides no statistics to support his claim. German author Steffen Karas calculates in his Book "66 Jahre BFC Dynamo - Auswärts mit 'nem Bus" that it was actually twice as common for opposing teams to score a match-deciding goal in the 86th minute or later in their wins or draws against BFC Dynamo, during the ten seasons when BFC Dynamo won the DDR-Oberliga than it was for BFC Dynamo in its wins or draws during the same period. Karas claims that BFC Dynamo only scored nine match-deciding goals in the 86th minute or later, in the 218 matches it won or drew during its ten championship years. Only one of those goals came from a penalty. That penalty was the controversial penalty against 1. FC Lokomotive Leipzig in the 1985-86 DDR-Oberliga on 22 March 1986, which was later proven to be correct.

Although rumours about match manipulation in favor of BFC Dynamo could never be completely dispelled, it is a fact that BFC Dynamo achieved its sporting success much on the basis of its successful youth work. Its youth work during the East German era is still recognized today. The club was able to filter the best talent through nationwide screening and train them in its youth academy. The youth academy had full-time trainers employed for every age group. The top performers of BFC Dynamo in the 1980s came mainly through its own youth teams, such as Hans-Jürgen Riediger, Norbert Trieloff, Bodo Rudwaleit, Artur Ullrich, Rainer Ernst, Bernd Schulz, Christian Backs, Frank Rohde and Andreas Thom. These players would influence the team for years. BFC Dynamo recruited fewer established players from the other teams in the Oberliga than other clubs did, such as SG Dynamo Dresden and FC Carl Zeiss Jena. Karas calculates in his book "66 Jahre BFC Dynamo - Auswärts mit 'nem Bus" that five of the top 10 delegations in the DDR-Oberliga instead involved FC Carl Zeiss Jena. Only a fifth of the players who won the ten championships with BFC Dynamo was older than 18 years when they joined the club, and those players came from teams that had been relegated from the DDR-Oberliga or the DDR-Liga.  The only major transfers to BFC Dynamo from other clubs during its most successful period in the 1980s were Frank Pastor from then-relegated HFC Chemie in 1984 and Thomas Doll from then-relegated FC Hansa Rostock in 1986. Both came from clubs that had been relegated from the DDR-Oberliga. These transfers would often be labeled delegations by supporters of other teams, but Doll left Hansa Rostock to ensure a chance to play for the national team. He had the opportunity to choose between BFC Dynamo and SG Dynamo Dresden but wanted to go to Berlin to be able to stay close to his family and because he already knew players in BFC Dynamo from the national youth teams.

Last titles in East Germany (1986–1989)

Renewed competition in the league (1986–1987)

The team made a friendly tour to Sweden in August 1986, where it played a number of matches against local teams, including the former opponent from the 1971-72 UEFA Cup Winners' Cup, Åtvidabergs FF.
BFC Dynamo moved its home matches to the Dynamo-Stadion im Sportforum for the 1986–87 season, as the Friedrich-Ludwig-Jahn-Sportpark was to be redeveloped. Frank Rohde was the new team captain for the 1986–87 season. Jörg Fügner would be used as a regular player during the season. The team was also joined by 20-year-old forward Thomas Doll from F.C. Hansa Rostock. F.C. Hansa Rostock had been relegated to the second division DDR-Liga after the 1985-86 DDR-Oberliga. Doll and Andreas Thom would form one of the most effective attacking pairings in East German football in the late 1980s. BFC Dynamo opened the 1986-87 DDR-Oberliga with a 4–1 win over FC Vorwärts Frankfurt in front of 12,000 spectators at the Dynamo-Stadion im Sportforum on 16 August 1986.  The team was in first place in the league after the fourth matchday. BFC Dynamo then met local rival 1. FC Union Berlin in the fifth matchday on 13 September 1986. BFC Dynamo won the derby with a massive 8–1 in front of 20,000 spectators at the Stadium der Weltjugend on 13 September 1986. Both Thomas Doll and Burkhard Reich scored their first goals for BFC Dynamo in the DDR-Oberliga in the derby.  BFC Dynamo qualified for the 1986-87 European Cup as the winners of the 1985-86 DDR-Oberliga. The team was drawn against the Swedish side Örgryte IS from Gothenburg in the first round. The first leg ended 2–3 for BFC Dynamo away at Nya Ullevi on 17 September 1986. Frank Pastor, Andreas Thom and Thomas Doll scored one goal each in the match. The second leg was played at the Dynamo-Stadion im Sportforum on 1 October 1986. BFC Dynamo defeated Örgryte IS 4–1 in front of 15,000 spectators and advanced to the second round. The team then met third-placed 1. FC Lokomotive Leipzig at home in the seventh matchday on 4 October 1986. BFC Dynamo lost the match 0–1. BFC Dynamo thus slipped down to second place in the table, while 1. FC Lokomotive Leipzig became the new leader. The team came back from the defeat with a clear 4–0 win at home over third-placed FC Carl Zeiss Jena on the following matchday on 18 October 1986. 17-year-old defender Marco Köller from the youth department made his debut for BFC Dynamo in the DDR-Oberliga as a substitute for Frank Pastor in the match against FC Carl Zeiss Jena. Köller would make a number of appearances with the first team of BFC Dynamo during the season.

BFC Dynamo was drawn against the Danish side Brøndby IF in the second round of the 1986-87 European Cup. The first leg was played at Brøndby Stadion on 22 October 1986. BFC Dynamo lost the match 2–1. The team then defeated BSG Fortschritt Bischofswerda 4–0 on the ninth matchday on 1 November 1986. Christian Backs scored three goals and Thomas Doll one goal in the match. BFC Dynamo was thus able to recapture first place in the league, as 1. FC Lokomotive Leipzig lost 2–1 away against FC Karl-Marx-Stadt at the same time. The return leg against Brøndby IF was played in front of 11,000 spectators at Dynamo-Stadion im Sportforum on 6 November 1986. Kim Vilfort managed to make it 0-1 for Brøndby IF already in the 7th minute. Rainer Ernst equalized to 1–1 in the 12th minute. BFC Dynamo then had a number of chances to score, but without success. The match eventually ended in a 1–1 draw and BFC Dynamo was thus eliminated from the competition. BFC Dynamo then met BSG Chemie Böhlen from the second tier DDR-Liga Staffel B in the second round of the 1986-87 FDGB-Pokal. The team lost 0–1. It was the first time since the 1965-66 FDGB-Pokal that the team did not advance further than the second round of the cup. BFC Dynamo defeated 1. FC Magdeburg 1–3 away on the tenth matchday on 12 November 1986. The team would win also the remaining matches until the winter break. BFC Dynamo finished the first half of the season in first place, two points ahead of second-placed 1. FC Lokomotive Leipzig.

BFC Dynamo met FC Vorwärts Frankfurt away on the 14th matchday on 28 February 1987. The match ended in a 1–1 draw. The 17-year-old defender Hendrik Herzog from the youth department made his debut for BFC Dynamo in the match against FC Vorwärts Frankfurt. BFC Dynamo met SG Dynamo Dresden away on the 16th matchday on 14 March 1987. Thomas Doll made it 0–1 to BFC Dynamo in the 12th minute. Ulf Kirsten, Matthias Döschner and Ralf Minge then scored three goals for SG Dynamo Dresden. Frank Pastor made it 3–2 in the 71st minute. The match ended 3–2 for SG Dynamo Dresden. BFC Dynamo was now on the same number of points as second-placed 1. FC Lokomotive Leipzig. The team met 1. FC Lokomotive Leipzig was away on the 20th matchday on 11 April 1987. Both teams still had the same number of points. BFC Dynamo defeated 1. FC Lokomotiv Leipzig 1–3 in front of 22,000 spectators at the Bruno-Plache-Stadion. The team followed up the win against 1. FC Lokomotive Leipzig with a 3–1 win against FC Carl Zeiss Jena on the 21st matchday in front of 10,000 spectators at the Dynamo-Stadion im Sportforum on 18 April 1987. Tomas Doll, Andreas Thom and Frank Pastor scored one goal each in the match. FC Carl Zeiss Jena had only managed to take one point from BFC Dynamo in East Berlin over the last ten years.  The team then met 1. FC Magdeburg at home on the 23rd matchday on 9 May 1985. BFC Dynamo won the match 2–1 in front of 12,000 spectators at Dynamo-Stadion im Sportforum. Doll and Thom scored the goals for BFC Dynamo.  BFC Dynamo then defeated BSG Stahl Brandeburg 0–1 away on the 24th matchday 16 May 1987. The team was thus able to extend the lead in the league, as both SG Dynamo Dresden and 1. FC Lokomotive Leipzig played draws at the same time. BFC Dynamo secured the league title with a 0–1 win over BSG Energie Cottbus on the 25th matchday in front of 13,600 spectators at the Stadion der Freundschaft on 23 May 1987. Rainer Ernst scored the winning goal for BFC Dynamo. The team eventually finished 1986-87 DDR-Oberliga 6 points ahead of second-placed SG Dynamo Dresden and eight points ahead of third-placed 1. FC Lokomotive Leipizig. The league title was the club's ninth consecutive league title. BFC Dynamo won a total of 79.91 percent of all possible points in the DDR-Oberliga between 1979 and 1987. Frank Pastor became the top goal scorer in the 1986-87 DDR-Oberliga.

The Double (1987–1988)
BFC Dynamo returned to the Friedrich-Ludwig-Jahn-Sportpark for the 1987–88 season. The stadium now had a completely new four-storey grandstand, a roof over the side opposite the main stand and new floodlight masts. Marco Köller would make recurring appearances with the first team during the season. BFC Dynamo opened the 1987-88 DDR-Oberliga with a 2–1 win over 1. FC Magdeburg in front of 14,000 spectators at Fredrich-Ludwig-Jahn-Sportpark. Thomas Doll and Frank Pastor scored one goal each in the match. The team then defeated 1. FC Union Berlin 0–4 in the second matchday on 15 August 1987. BFC Dynamo had now captured first place in the league. The team then defeated F.C. Hansa Rostock 4–0 away on the fifth matchday on 5 September 1987. Andreas Thom scored two goals in the match. BFC Dynamo then met FC Carl Zeiss Jena at home on the sixth matchday on 9 September 1987. The team won the match with a massive 5–0. Andreas Thom scored the first three goals for BFC Dynamo in the match.

BFC Dynamo qualified for the 1987-88 European Cup as winners of the 1986-87 DDR-Oberliga. The team was drawn against the French champions FC Girondins de Bordeaux in the first round. The first leg was played in front of 30,000 spectators at the Stade Chaban-Delmas on 16 September 1987. The score was 0-0 after halftime. Dominique Bijotat then made it 1-0 for Bordeaux from an offside position in the 47th minute. Jean-Marc Ferreri then made it 2–0 for Bordeaux in the 58th minute. BFC Dynamo eventually lost the match 2–0. The team would face a very difficult task in the return leg.  The team then met SG Dynamo Dresden away on the seventh matchday on 26 September 1987. BFC Dynamo lost the match by 1–3. It was the team's first loss of the league season. The return leg against FC Girondins de Bordeaux was played in front of 20,000 spectators at the Friedrich-Ludwig-Jahn-Sportpark on 30 September 1987. BFC Dynamo lost also the return leg 0-2 and was eliminated from the tournament. BFC Dynamo played a 2–2 draw away against HFC Chemie on the 9th matchday and then a 3–3 draw at home against FC Rot-Weiß Erfurt on the tenth matchday. Second-placed 1. FC Lokomotive was thus able to close the gap in the league. Long-time defender Norbert Trieloff was transferred to 1. FC Union Berlin in November 1987. BFC Dynamo met fourth-placed FC Karl-Marx-Stadt away in the 11th match on 21 November 1987. The team won the match 2–4. BFC Dynamo then met the reserve team BFC Dynamo II in the round of 16 in the 1987-88 FDGB-Pokal on 28 November 1987. The match ended 3–2 for BFC Dynamo. 21-year-old forward Dirk Anders scored both goals for the reserve team in the match. Anders had made his debut with the first team of BFC Dynamo in the DDR-Oberliga at home against FC Karl-Marx-Stadt on the last matchday of the 1986-87 DDR-Oberliga. He would now make a number of appearances with the first team. Anders would be included in the starting line-up already in the upcoming match at home against BSG Wismut Aue on the 12th matchday on 5 December 1987. BFC Dynamo finished the first half of the season in first place. However, the team had the same number of points as second-placed 1. FC Lokomotive Leipzig only led the league on a better goal difference. Andreas Thom was the best goalscorer in the league by a wide margin during the first half of the league season. He had scored 14 goals in 13 matches.

The second half of the season would be a tight race between BFC Dynamo and 1. FC Lokomotive Leipzig until the end. The lead in the league would change several times between BFC Dynamo, SG Dynamo Dresden and 1. FC Lokomotive Leipzig. BFC Dynamo met 1. FC Lokomotive Leipzig home on the 16th matchday on 12 March 1988. The team lost the match 0–2. Hans-Jörg Leitzke and Matthias Zimmerling scored the two goals for 1. FC Lokomotive Lepzig. However, BFC Dynamo was still in first place in the league through better goal difference. Both teams had their return matches against 1. FC Magdeburg from the 14th and 15th matchdays postponed. BFC Dynamo then played its match against 1. FC Magdeburg from the 14th matchday on 15 March 1988. Dirk Anders made it 0-1 for BFC Dynamo in the 16th minute, but Damian Halata equalized for 1. FC Magdeburg was on a penalty in the 17th minute. Halata then made it 2–1 to 1. FC Magdeburg in the 87th minute. BFC Dynamo eventually lost the match 2–1. The team then played a 0–0 draw away against BSG Stahl Brandeburg on the 17th matchday on 19 March 1988. SG Dynamo Dresden could now take over the lead in the league. BFC Dynamo then defeated F.C. Hansa Rostock 5–1 on the 18th matchday on 26 March 1988. Burkhard Reich scored two goals for BFC Dynamo in the match. 1. FC Lokomotive Leipzig played a 1–1 draw against SG Dynamo Dresden on the 18th matchday. BFC Dynamo was thus able to recapture first place in the league, but had the same number of points as second-placed SG Dynamo Dresden and was only one point ahead of third-placed 1. FC Lokomotive Leipzig. However, 1. FC Lokomotive Leipzig had still not played its return match against 1. FC Magdeburg. The match against FC Carl Zeiss Jena away on the 19th matchday was postponed. SG Dynamo Dresden could therefore again take over the lead in the league with a 2–0 win over F.C. Hansa Rostock on the 19th matchday. BFC Dynamo then met rival SG Dynamo Dresden at home on the 20th matchday on 6 April 1988. The team won the match 1–0 in front of 24,000 spectators at Friedrich-Ludwig-Jahn-Sportpark  The winning goal was scored by Andreas Thom. BFC Dynamo was now again in first place. Both 1. FC Lokomotive Leipzig and SG Dynamo Dresden lost points on the 21st matchday. BFC Dynamo was now one point ahead of 1. FC Lokomtive Leizpig. Both BFC Dynamo and 1. FC Lokomtive Leipzig played their previously postponed matches on 19 April 1988. BFC Dynamo defeated FC Carl Zeiss Jena 2–3 away in its match from the 19th matchday, while 1. FC Lokomotiv Leipzig defeated 1. FC Magdeburg by 3–1 at home in its match from the 15th matchday. BFC Dynamo then lost 2–3 at home to HFC Chemie on the 22nd matchday on 23 April 1988. 1. FC Lokomotive Leipzig could now take over the lead in the league. However, BFC Dynamo recaptured first place already in the following matchday. But the team again had the same number of points as second-placed 1. FC Lokomotive Leipzig only led the league on better goal difference.

BFC Dynamo reached the semi-finals of the 1987-88 FDGB-Pokal. The team was drawn against F.C. Hansa Rostock. The semi-final was played at the Friedrich-Ludwig-Jahn-Sportpark on 18 May 1988. BFC Dynamo won the match 4-0 and advanced to the final. Burkhard Reich, Rainer Ernst, Andreas Thom and Eike Küttner scored one goal each in the match. BFC Dynamo and 1. FC Lokomotive Leipzig  again had the same number of points before the last matchday. BFC Dynamo had a goal difference of 28, while 1. FC Lokomotive Leipzig had a goal difference of 19. BFC Dynamo met 11th-placed FC Vorwärts Frankfurt at home on the 26th matchday on 28 May 1988. FC Vorwärts Frankfurt was only one point from the relegation zone and would have to fight for its place in the DDR-Oberliga. 1. FC Lokomotive Leipzig met tenth-placed FC Rot-Weiß Erfurt. Also, FC Rot-Weiß Erfurt was at risk of relegation. Heiko Scholz scored 1-0 for 1. FC Lokomotive Leipzig in the 19th minute. 1. FC Lokomotive Leipzig was practically the champion at this time. Burkhard Reich then finally scored 1–0 against BFC Dynamo with a header in the 36th minute. BFC Dynamo eventually won the match 1–0 in front of 7,000 spectators at the Friedrich-Ludwig-Jahn-Sportpark. 1. FC Lokomotive Leipzig defeated FC Rot-Weiß Erfurt 3–1, but it was not enough. BFC Dynamo finished with a better goal difference and thus captured its tenth consecutive league title. Andreas Thom became the best goal scorer in the 1987-88 DDR-Oberliga with 20 goals. BFC Dynamo was then set to play the final of the 1987-88 FDGB-Pokal. The team would face FC Carl-Zeiss Jena. The final was played in front of 40,000 spectators at Stadion der Weltjugend on 4 June 1988. The score was 0-0 after full-time. Thomas Doll and Michael Schulz then scored two goals for BFC Dynamo in overtime. The team eventually won the match 2–0. BFC Dynamo had thus finally won the Double, becoming the second team in the history of East German football after SG Dynamo Dresden won the Double. Andreas Thom had become the player of the week six times in the 1987-88 DDR-Oberliga and was eventually voted the 1988 East German footballer of the year. Peter Kaehlitz was transferred to SG Dynamo Fürstenwalde, Marco Kostmann left for F.C. Hansa Rostock and Heiko Brestrich left for BSG Stahl Brandenburg after the season.

Disaster in Bremen (1988)
Long-time club president Manfred Kirste was replaced before the 1988–89 season. Kirste had served as president since the club's founding in 1966. Herbert Krafft became the new club president. Krafft had a background in the Volkspolizei. The team was joined by young goalkeeper Oskar Kosche from SG Dynamo Fürstenwalde for the 1988–89 season. Kosche also had a background in the youth department of BFC Dynamo. Young defender Hendrik Herzog would also make recurring appearances with the first team during the season. BFC Dynamo started the 1988-89 DDR-Oberliga with three draws. The team played a 2–2 draw at home against HFC Chemie in the opening match, a 2-2 draw away against BSG Wismut Aue in the second matchday and then a 1–1 draw against 1. FC Union Berlin on the third matchday. The team captured its first win of the league season on the fourth matchday, with a 2–6 win away against FC Rot-Weiß Erfurt on 2 September 1988. Andreas Thom scored two goals, Frank Pastor two goals, Rainer Ernst one goal and Dirk Anders one goal in the match. The team was now in fifth place in the league.

BFC Dynamo qualified for the 1988-89 European Cup as winners of the 1987-88 DDR-Oberliga. The team was drawn against the West German champion SV Werder Bremen in the first round. The first leg was played in front of 24,000 spectators at Friedrich-Jahn-Sportpark on 6 September 1988.  Among the spectators were Erich Mieke and SED First Secretary in East Berlin Günter Schabowski, and among the guests was former West German Chancellor Willy Brandt. Thomas Doll made it 1-0 for BFC Dynamo in the 16th minute of the match. Andreas Thom and Frank Pastor then scored two more goals in the second half. BFC Dynamo sensationally defeated SV Werder Bremen 3–0. Goalkeeper Bodo Rudwaleit was a match hero for BFC Dynamo with numerous saves. BFC Dynamo then played a 1–1 draw away against 1. FC Magdeburg on the fifth matchday on 17 September 1988. The team then met the first-placed SG Dynamo Dresden away on the sixth matchday on 25 September 1988. The score was 0-0 after the first half. Andreas Trautmann and Ulf Kirsten then scored two goals in quick succession for SG Dynamo Dresden. Eike Küttner made it 2–1 in the 63rd minute. but BFC Dynamo failed to equalize. SG Dynamo Dresden won the match 2–1. BFC Dynamo was then set to play the return leg against SV Werner Bremen in the first round of the 1988-89 European Cup. The match was played at the Weser-Stadion on 11 October 1988. SV Werner Bremen would come to dominate the match. BFC Dynamo sensationally lost 5-0 and was eliminated on goal difference. The return leg would become known as "The Second Miracle on the Weser". Andreas Thom stated afterwards: "I can not get worse than this". Coach Jürgen Bogs summoned up: "That here, was total shit".

It has been rumoured that doping might explain the surprising results in the meeting. Researcher Giselher Spitzer claims that players of BFC Dynamo had been given amphetamines before the first leg. The Stasi allegedly did not want to take this risk in the return leg in Bremen for fear of control. However, a more likely explanation for the surprising loss in Bremen is that the players of BFC Dynamo could not cope with the tremendous media pressure following their home win. Roles had changed during the five-week-long break before the return leg. BFC Dynamo was pushed into the role of favorites, while Werder Bremen was given enough time to build motivation. The match had high political significance: Mielke had made it clear to the team before the return leg that "this was about beating the class enemy". Frank Rohde has said: "You have to consider history, actually, we could only loose". Goalkeeper Rudwaleit conceded that it was a "mental thing". The Stasi also had its explanation for the defeat in Bremen. The Stasi claimed that that the main reason for the defeat was that "the team was not morally and ideologically prepared for the match" and "did not have a functioning management that met all the requirements for a stay in Bremen".

Players of BFC Dynamo had apparently also been distracted from their match-day preparations by shopping opportunities. Bogs wanted to travel to Bremen two days in advance. This was denied by the Stasi and the player bus was only allowed to leave East Berlin on Monday morning. The player bus then got stuck in West German morning traffic. Instead of arriving at around 12:00 PM, the bus arrived at 3:00 PM in Bremen. The schedule of Bogs could no longer be held, so the planned shopping tour the day before the match was allegedly cancelled. Werder Bremen Manager Willi Lemke allegedly stopped by the hotel and instead offered a shopping spree for the next day, where players of BFC Dynamo were given the opportunity to buy West German consumer goods at a "Werder discount". Some sources suggest that he actually organized a sale at the player hotel where all kinds of goods were sold. According to Bogs, the player bus was completely stocked up with home appliances, televisions and consumer electronics when it arrived at the Weser-Stadion 90 minutes before kick-off. There are allegations that this was purposely done by Lemke for players of BFC Dynamo to lose their concentration. However, the versions of those involved differ. Frank Rohde has many years later claimed that what has been said about the match over the years is "complete nonsense" and that "the process was the same as always with the European Cup". Bogs was forced to justify himself to the DFV the day after the defeat and would receive a reprimand. BFC Dynamo won the next match 5–1 at home against FC Karl-Marx-Stadt on the ninth matchday on 22 October 1988. Bogs has described the defeat in Bremen as the most spectacular defeat in his career, but not his most bitter. He claims that his most bitter defeat was the 4–1 defeat to Red Star Belgrade on stoppage time in the first round of the 1978–79 UEFA Cup.

Decline in the league and last titles in East Germany (1988–1989)
BFC Dynamo lost more important points to its league rivals towards the end of the autumn. The team met 1. FC Lokomotive Leipzig at home on the tenth matchday on 4 November 1988. BFC Dynamo lost the match 0-2 and conceded its second loss of the league season. The team defeated tenth-placed BSG Energie Cottbus 0–2 away on the following matchday, but then played a 1–1 draw against FC Carl Zeiss Jena at home on the 12th matchday. Young midfielder Jens-Uwe Zöphel from the youth department made his debut in the DDR-Oberliga in the match against FC Carl Zeiss Jena. BFC Dynamo then met F.C. Hansa Rostock away on the last matchday before the winter break on 3 December 1988. F.C. Hansa Rostock was coached by former BFC Dynamo player Werner Voigt at the time. BFC Dynamo lost the match 1–0. The team finished the first half of the season in fourth place, a full nine points behind first-placed SG Dynamo Dresden. It was the club's worst mid-seasonal result in 14 years. The team had played five draws and conceded three losses in the first 13 matches of the league season. Frank Pastor was the best goal scorer of BFC Dynamo in the league during the first half of the season with six goals. The last season's league top goal scorer Andreas Thom scored five goals. BFC Dynamo met 1. FC Union Berlin in the quarter-finals of the 1988-89 FDGB-Pokal. The match was played in front in front of 20,000 spectators at the Stadion an der Alten Försterei on 10 December 1988. Eike Küttner scored 0-1 for BFC Dynamo already in the first match minute. BFC Dynamo eventually won the match 0-2 and advanced to the semi-finals. Fans of 1. FC Union Berlin chanted racist slogans during the match, such as "Jewish pigs!".  Andreas Belka left for BSG Energie Cottbus and Thomas Grether for 1. FC Union Berlin during the winter break. Coach Jürgen Bogs and Assistant coach Joachim Hall were called up to the Central Management Office (BdZL) of SV Dynamo on 15 January 1989. Hall was immediately released from his duties, while Bogs was allowed to remain as coach for the rest of the season.

The average home attendance had dropped from 15,000 to less than 9,000 during the club's most successful years in the 1980s. Ordinary fans feared the Stasi and had become disillusioned with political interference. Particularly aggravating were the restrictions on ticket sales that the Stasi imposed at international matches for political reasons. Only a small number of tickets have been allowed for ordinary fans during European Cup matches against opponents such as Hamburger SV and SV Werder Bremen. The vast majority of the tickets had instead been allocated to a politically hand-picked audience. BFC Dynamo had also seen the emergence of a well-organized hooligan scene in the 1980s. The development was partly a response to the increasing state repression against the supporter scene. The Stasi had tried to control the supporter scene with a broad catalogue of repressive measures. The supporter scene had been increasingly associated with skinheads and far-right tendencies since the mid-1980s. Right-wing slogans and fascist chants were considered the most challenging forms of provocations, as anti-fascism was one of the founding myths of the East German regime. For young people, being a Nazi was sometimes considered the sharpest form of opposition. However, instances of Nazi provocations did not necessarily reflect genuine political convictions. At least some part of the "drift to the right" among East German youth during the 1980s was rooted in a desire to position oneself wherever the state was not. One fan of BFC Dynamo said: "None of us really knew anything about politics. But to raise your arm in front of the Volkspolizei was a real kick. You did that and for some of them, their whole world just fell apart".

Jens-Uwe Zöphel would make recurring appearances with the first team during the second half of the 1988-89 season. The results in the league would improve after the winter break. The team defeated HFC Chemie 1–4 away on the 14th matchday on 24 February 1989. BFC Dynamo now climbed to second place in the league. The team then defeated BSG Wismut Aue 2–1 at home on the 15th matchday on 4 March 1989. BFC Dynamo was drawn against  FC Rot-Weiß Erfurtin in the semi-finals of the 1988-89 FDGB-Pokal. BFC Dynamo won the semi-final 6–1 in front of 7,500 spectators at the Friedrich-Ludwig-Jahn-Sportpark on 11 March 1989. Six players of BFC Dynamo scored one goal each in the match, including Zöphel, who scored the 5-0 goal. BFC Dynamo then defeated local rival 1. FC Union Berlin 3–2 on the 16th matchday on the 18 March 1989. 1. FC Union Berlin fielded four former BFC Dynamo players in the starting eleven: Olaf Seier, Thomas Grether, Mario Maek and Norbert Trieloff. The team then met FC Rot-Weiß Erfurt  at home on the 17th matchday on 25 March 1989. FC Rot-Weiß Erfurt got revenge for the semi-final and BFC Dynamo lost the match 1–2. BFC Dynamo was then set to play FC Karl-Marx-Stadt in the final of the 1989-89 FDGB-Pokal. The final was played in front of 35,000 spectators at the Stadion der Weltjugend on 1 April 1989. BFC Dynamo was a clear favorite with three national team players in the squad. The score was 0–0 at the half-break. Andreas Thom then made it 1–0 to BFC Dynamo in the 57th minute. BFC Dynamo eventually won the final 1-0 and thus won its third cup title.

BFC Dynamo met first-placed SG Dynamo Dresden at home on the 19th matchday on 19 April 1989. BFC Dynamo  was now in third place in the league, seven points behind SG Dynamo Dresden. Ulf Kirsten made it 0–1 to SG Dynamo Dresden in the 31st match minute, but Eike Küttner equalized 1–1 in the 56th match minute. The match eventually ended 1–1 in front of 18,500 spectators at the Friedrich-Ludwig-Jahn-Sportpark. The opportunity to defend the league title was now practically lost. BFC Dynamo then lost 2–1 away to FC Karl-Marx-Stadt on the 22nd matchday and then 2–4 at home to 1. FC Lokomotive Leipzig on the 23rd matchday. SG Dynamo Dresden won the league title on the 23rd matchday, thus breaking BFC Dynamo's ten-year-long dominance in the league. BFC Dynamo was now in third place in the league, nine points behind the new champion SG Dynamo Dresden. BFC Dynamo then played 1–1 against BSG Energie Cottbus on the 24th matchday on 24 May 1989. The team could thus climb to second place in the league, as F.C. Hansa Rostock lost 3–0 away against BSG Stahl Brandenburg at the same time. Young defender Jörn Lenz from the youth department made his debut for BFC Dynamo in the DDR-Oberliga in the match against BSG Energie Cottbus. Lenz made his debut with the first team of BFC Dynamo in the first round of the 1988–89 FDGB-Pokal against BSG Energie Cottbus II on 9 September 1988.  BFC Dynamo then defeated FC Carl Zeiss Jena 0–1 away on the 24th matchday. The team finally met third-placed F.C. Hansa Rostock on the last matchday on 3 June 1989. F.C. Hansa Rostock was only one point behind in the league. BFC Dynamo won the match 4–0 in front of 9,000 spectators at Friedrich-Ludwig-Jahn-Sportpark. The team thus finished the 1988-89 DDR-Oberliga in second place. Andreas Thom and Thomas Doll became the top scorers for BFC Dynamo in the league with 13 goals each. Michael Schulz left for BSG Stahl Henningsdorf after the season.

With the performance of the team declining in the 1988–89 season and the attendance number continuing to fall, the Central Audit Commission at the Central Management Office (BdZL) of SV Dynamo was authorized by SV Dynamo President Erich Mielke to investigate the club. The Central Management Office had been aggrieved that the special position of the club had enabled it to escape its control. The commission now used the inquiry as an opportunity to cut the overmighty organization down to size. The commission was critical of the inefficient use of resources, materialism, low motivation and lack of political-ideological education of players. As a solution, the Central Management Office assumed full responsibility for the material, political and financial management of the club by mid-1989. Former player Michael Noack would later complain that BFC Dynamo had suffered from triple management: the DFV, the Central Management Office (BdZL) of SV Dynamo and the Stasi, whereby a minority had ruled over the club.

Jürgen Bogs was replaced as coach after the 1988–89 season. Helmut Jäschke became the new coach. Jäschke had previously served as a coach of the reserve team BFC Dynamo II. Helmut Koch became the assistant coach of Jäschke. Bogs would later instead take on the role of "head coach" in the club, which was a managerial role in the club at the time. The team was joined by attacking midfielder Heiko Bonan from 1. FC Magdeburg and defender Jörg Buder from the reserve team for the 1989–90 season. As the winner of the 1988-89 FDGB-Pokal, BFC Dynamo was set to play the DFV-Supercup against league champions SG Dynamo Dresden. It was the first edition of the DFV-Supercup. The match was played in front of 22,348 spectators at the Stadion der Freundschaft in Cottbus on 5 August 1989. SED Politburo and Central Committee members Egon Krenz and Erich Mielke, the Head of the Department for Sport of the SED Central Committee Rudolf Hellmann and the DTSB First Vice President Horst Röder were among the spectators. Bernd Schulz made it 1-0 for BFC Dynamo in the 31st minute. Thomas Doll then scored two goals for BFC Dynamo in the middle of the second half. The score was 4–0 for BFC Dynamo at the end of the match. Matthias Sammer then scored one goal for SG Dynamo Dresden in the 87th minute. BFC Dynamo eventually won the match 4-1 and captured the title. BFC Dynamo would be the first and only winner of the DFV-Supercup in the history of East German football.

See also
 History of Berliner FC Dynamo (1954–1978)
 History of Berliner FC Dynamo (1989–2004)
 History of Berliner FC Dynamo (2004–present)

Explanatory notes

References

Berliner FC Dynamo
Berliner FC Dynamo
History of football in Germany